

293001–293100 

|-bgcolor=#E9E9E9
| 293001 ||  || — || November 17, 2006 || Mount Lemmon || Mount Lemmon Survey || — || align=right | 2.8 km || 
|-id=002 bgcolor=#E9E9E9
| 293002 ||  || — || November 17, 2006 || Mount Lemmon || Mount Lemmon Survey || — || align=right | 1.8 km || 
|-id=003 bgcolor=#E9E9E9
| 293003 ||  || — || November 17, 2006 || Mount Lemmon || Mount Lemmon Survey || — || align=right | 1.8 km || 
|-id=004 bgcolor=#fefefe
| 293004 ||  || — || November 17, 2006 || Mount Lemmon || Mount Lemmon Survey || — || align=right | 1.0 km || 
|-id=005 bgcolor=#E9E9E9
| 293005 ||  || — || November 18, 2006 || Catalina || CSS || — || align=right | 3.3 km || 
|-id=006 bgcolor=#fefefe
| 293006 ||  || — || November 22, 2006 || 7300 Observatory || W. K. Y. Yeung || — || align=right data-sort-value="0.91" | 910 m || 
|-id=007 bgcolor=#fefefe
| 293007 ||  || — || November 16, 2006 || Kitt Peak || Spacewatch || — || align=right data-sort-value="0.73" | 730 m || 
|-id=008 bgcolor=#d6d6d6
| 293008 ||  || — || November 16, 2006 || Kitt Peak || Spacewatch || — || align=right | 3.3 km || 
|-id=009 bgcolor=#E9E9E9
| 293009 ||  || — || November 16, 2006 || Kitt Peak || Spacewatch || — || align=right | 1.6 km || 
|-id=010 bgcolor=#d6d6d6
| 293010 ||  || — || November 16, 2006 || Kitt Peak || Spacewatch || — || align=right | 6.0 km || 
|-id=011 bgcolor=#E9E9E9
| 293011 ||  || — || November 16, 2006 || Kitt Peak || Spacewatch || WIT || align=right data-sort-value="0.99" | 990 m || 
|-id=012 bgcolor=#E9E9E9
| 293012 ||  || — || November 16, 2006 || Kitt Peak || Spacewatch || — || align=right | 2.0 km || 
|-id=013 bgcolor=#fefefe
| 293013 ||  || — || November 16, 2006 || Mount Lemmon || Mount Lemmon Survey || — || align=right data-sort-value="0.82" | 820 m || 
|-id=014 bgcolor=#E9E9E9
| 293014 ||  || — || November 16, 2006 || Mount Lemmon || Mount Lemmon Survey || — || align=right | 1.8 km || 
|-id=015 bgcolor=#d6d6d6
| 293015 ||  || — || November 16, 2006 || Kitt Peak || Spacewatch || — || align=right | 6.2 km || 
|-id=016 bgcolor=#E9E9E9
| 293016 ||  || — || November 16, 2006 || Kitt Peak || Spacewatch || — || align=right | 1.4 km || 
|-id=017 bgcolor=#d6d6d6
| 293017 ||  || — || November 16, 2006 || Mount Lemmon || Mount Lemmon Survey || HYG || align=right | 5.0 km || 
|-id=018 bgcolor=#E9E9E9
| 293018 ||  || — || November 16, 2006 || Mount Lemmon || Mount Lemmon Survey || HEN || align=right | 1.1 km || 
|-id=019 bgcolor=#E9E9E9
| 293019 ||  || — || November 16, 2006 || Kitt Peak || Spacewatch || — || align=right | 1.6 km || 
|-id=020 bgcolor=#E9E9E9
| 293020 ||  || — || November 16, 2006 || Kitt Peak || Spacewatch || — || align=right | 1.3 km || 
|-id=021 bgcolor=#d6d6d6
| 293021 ||  || — || November 16, 2006 || Kitt Peak || Spacewatch || — || align=right | 2.8 km || 
|-id=022 bgcolor=#d6d6d6
| 293022 ||  || — || November 17, 2006 || Kitt Peak || Spacewatch || — || align=right | 4.4 km || 
|-id=023 bgcolor=#fefefe
| 293023 ||  || — || November 17, 2006 || Kitt Peak || Spacewatch || — || align=right | 1.2 km || 
|-id=024 bgcolor=#E9E9E9
| 293024 ||  || — || November 17, 2006 || Mount Lemmon || Mount Lemmon Survey || MRX || align=right | 1.2 km || 
|-id=025 bgcolor=#E9E9E9
| 293025 ||  || — || November 17, 2006 || Mount Lemmon || Mount Lemmon Survey || — || align=right | 1.7 km || 
|-id=026 bgcolor=#d6d6d6
| 293026 ||  || — || November 17, 2006 || Kitt Peak || Spacewatch || — || align=right | 4.4 km || 
|-id=027 bgcolor=#d6d6d6
| 293027 ||  || — || November 17, 2006 || Mount Lemmon || Mount Lemmon Survey || HYG || align=right | 3.2 km || 
|-id=028 bgcolor=#E9E9E9
| 293028 ||  || — || November 17, 2006 || Mount Lemmon || Mount Lemmon Survey || — || align=right | 2.9 km || 
|-id=029 bgcolor=#d6d6d6
| 293029 ||  || — || November 18, 2006 || Kitt Peak || Spacewatch || — || align=right | 2.8 km || 
|-id=030 bgcolor=#E9E9E9
| 293030 ||  || — || November 18, 2006 || Kitt Peak || Spacewatch || HOF || align=right | 2.6 km || 
|-id=031 bgcolor=#d6d6d6
| 293031 ||  || — || November 18, 2006 || Kitt Peak || Spacewatch || — || align=right | 3.0 km || 
|-id=032 bgcolor=#d6d6d6
| 293032 ||  || — || November 18, 2006 || Kitt Peak || Spacewatch || THM || align=right | 2.7 km || 
|-id=033 bgcolor=#fefefe
| 293033 ||  || — || November 18, 2006 || Kitt Peak || Spacewatch || NYS || align=right data-sort-value="0.85" | 850 m || 
|-id=034 bgcolor=#d6d6d6
| 293034 ||  || — || November 18, 2006 || Kitt Peak || Spacewatch || — || align=right | 3.0 km || 
|-id=035 bgcolor=#fefefe
| 293035 ||  || — || November 18, 2006 || Socorro || LINEAR || H || align=right data-sort-value="0.95" | 950 m || 
|-id=036 bgcolor=#d6d6d6
| 293036 ||  || — || November 18, 2006 || Socorro || LINEAR || — || align=right | 4.4 km || 
|-id=037 bgcolor=#fefefe
| 293037 ||  || — || November 18, 2006 || Mount Lemmon || Mount Lemmon Survey || — || align=right data-sort-value="0.73" | 730 m || 
|-id=038 bgcolor=#d6d6d6
| 293038 ||  || — || November 18, 2006 || Kitt Peak || Spacewatch || VER || align=right | 4.6 km || 
|-id=039 bgcolor=#E9E9E9
| 293039 ||  || — || November 19, 2006 || Kitt Peak || Spacewatch || — || align=right | 1.5 km || 
|-id=040 bgcolor=#d6d6d6
| 293040 ||  || — || November 19, 2006 || Kitt Peak || Spacewatch || — || align=right | 3.1 km || 
|-id=041 bgcolor=#E9E9E9
| 293041 ||  || — || November 19, 2006 || Kitt Peak || Spacewatch || — || align=right | 1.5 km || 
|-id=042 bgcolor=#d6d6d6
| 293042 ||  || — || November 19, 2006 || Kitt Peak || Spacewatch || HYG || align=right | 3.8 km || 
|-id=043 bgcolor=#fefefe
| 293043 ||  || — || November 19, 2006 || Kitt Peak || Spacewatch || NYS || align=right data-sort-value="0.78" | 780 m || 
|-id=044 bgcolor=#fefefe
| 293044 ||  || — || November 19, 2006 || Catalina || CSS || — || align=right data-sort-value="0.96" | 960 m || 
|-id=045 bgcolor=#fefefe
| 293045 ||  || — || November 19, 2006 || Catalina || CSS || V || align=right data-sort-value="0.95" | 950 m || 
|-id=046 bgcolor=#E9E9E9
| 293046 ||  || — || November 19, 2006 || Socorro || LINEAR || — || align=right | 2.7 km || 
|-id=047 bgcolor=#fefefe
| 293047 ||  || — || November 19, 2006 || Kitt Peak || Spacewatch || — || align=right data-sort-value="0.99" | 990 m || 
|-id=048 bgcolor=#d6d6d6
| 293048 ||  || — || November 19, 2006 || Kitt Peak || Spacewatch || THM || align=right | 2.6 km || 
|-id=049 bgcolor=#E9E9E9
| 293049 ||  || — || November 19, 2006 || Catalina || CSS || — || align=right | 1.1 km || 
|-id=050 bgcolor=#d6d6d6
| 293050 ||  || — || November 19, 2006 || Kitt Peak || Spacewatch || EOS || align=right | 2.6 km || 
|-id=051 bgcolor=#fefefe
| 293051 ||  || — || November 19, 2006 || Kitt Peak || Spacewatch || V || align=right data-sort-value="0.89" | 890 m || 
|-id=052 bgcolor=#E9E9E9
| 293052 ||  || — || November 20, 2006 || Kitt Peak || Spacewatch || — || align=right | 1.8 km || 
|-id=053 bgcolor=#E9E9E9
| 293053 ||  || — || November 22, 2006 || Mount Lemmon || Mount Lemmon Survey || — || align=right | 3.0 km || 
|-id=054 bgcolor=#FFC2E0
| 293054 ||  || — || November 25, 2006 || Mount Lemmon || Mount Lemmon Survey || APO || align=right data-sort-value="0.74" | 740 m || 
|-id=055 bgcolor=#E9E9E9
| 293055 ||  || — || November 24, 2006 || Nyukasa || Mount Nyukasa Stn. || — || align=right | 1.1 km || 
|-id=056 bgcolor=#E9E9E9
| 293056 ||  || — || November 18, 2006 || Catalina || CSS || — || align=right | 1.7 km || 
|-id=057 bgcolor=#E9E9E9
| 293057 ||  || — || November 18, 2006 || Kitt Peak || Spacewatch || — || align=right | 1.4 km || 
|-id=058 bgcolor=#E9E9E9
| 293058 ||  || — || November 20, 2006 || Kitt Peak || Spacewatch || HOF || align=right | 2.5 km || 
|-id=059 bgcolor=#d6d6d6
| 293059 ||  || — || November 20, 2006 || Kitt Peak || Spacewatch || — || align=right | 3.8 km || 
|-id=060 bgcolor=#fefefe
| 293060 ||  || — || November 20, 2006 || Kitt Peak || Spacewatch || — || align=right data-sort-value="0.75" | 750 m || 
|-id=061 bgcolor=#E9E9E9
| 293061 ||  || — || November 20, 2006 || Kitt Peak || Spacewatch || MAR || align=right | 1.5 km || 
|-id=062 bgcolor=#fefefe
| 293062 ||  || — || November 21, 2006 || Mount Lemmon || Mount Lemmon Survey || — || align=right data-sort-value="0.68" | 680 m || 
|-id=063 bgcolor=#fefefe
| 293063 ||  || — || November 21, 2006 || Mount Lemmon || Mount Lemmon Survey || — || align=right data-sort-value="0.91" | 910 m || 
|-id=064 bgcolor=#d6d6d6
| 293064 ||  || — || November 22, 2006 || Kitt Peak || Spacewatch || — || align=right | 3.0 km || 
|-id=065 bgcolor=#E9E9E9
| 293065 ||  || — || November 22, 2006 || Mount Lemmon || Mount Lemmon Survey || — || align=right | 1.4 km || 
|-id=066 bgcolor=#E9E9E9
| 293066 ||  || — || November 22, 2006 || Catalina || CSS || WIT || align=right | 1.4 km || 
|-id=067 bgcolor=#d6d6d6
| 293067 ||  || — || November 22, 2006 || Kitt Peak || Spacewatch || KOR || align=right | 1.9 km || 
|-id=068 bgcolor=#fefefe
| 293068 ||  || — || November 22, 2006 || Kitt Peak || Spacewatch || MAS || align=right data-sort-value="0.72" | 720 m || 
|-id=069 bgcolor=#E9E9E9
| 293069 ||  || — || November 23, 2006 || Kitt Peak || Spacewatch || — || align=right | 1.8 km || 
|-id=070 bgcolor=#d6d6d6
| 293070 ||  || — || November 23, 2006 || Kitt Peak || Spacewatch || HYG || align=right | 3.1 km || 
|-id=071 bgcolor=#d6d6d6
| 293071 ||  || — || November 23, 2006 || Kitt Peak || Spacewatch || — || align=right | 4.8 km || 
|-id=072 bgcolor=#E9E9E9
| 293072 ||  || — || November 23, 2006 || Kitt Peak || Spacewatch || — || align=right | 1.6 km || 
|-id=073 bgcolor=#E9E9E9
| 293073 ||  || — || November 23, 2006 || Kitt Peak || Spacewatch || ADE || align=right | 3.8 km || 
|-id=074 bgcolor=#E9E9E9
| 293074 ||  || — || November 23, 2006 || Kitt Peak || Spacewatch || — || align=right | 2.1 km || 
|-id=075 bgcolor=#E9E9E9
| 293075 ||  || — || November 23, 2006 || Kitt Peak || Spacewatch || HOF || align=right | 3.1 km || 
|-id=076 bgcolor=#E9E9E9
| 293076 ||  || — || November 23, 2006 || Kitt Peak || Spacewatch || WIT || align=right | 1.2 km || 
|-id=077 bgcolor=#E9E9E9
| 293077 ||  || — || November 23, 2006 || Kitt Peak || Spacewatch || — || align=right | 1.5 km || 
|-id=078 bgcolor=#fefefe
| 293078 ||  || — || November 23, 2006 || Mount Lemmon || Mount Lemmon Survey || V || align=right data-sort-value="0.75" | 750 m || 
|-id=079 bgcolor=#E9E9E9
| 293079 ||  || — || November 24, 2006 || Mount Lemmon || Mount Lemmon Survey || HEN || align=right | 1.1 km || 
|-id=080 bgcolor=#fefefe
| 293080 ||  || — || November 24, 2006 || Mount Lemmon || Mount Lemmon Survey || MAS || align=right data-sort-value="0.79" | 790 m || 
|-id=081 bgcolor=#E9E9E9
| 293081 ||  || — || November 24, 2006 || Kitt Peak || Spacewatch || — || align=right | 2.5 km || 
|-id=082 bgcolor=#d6d6d6
| 293082 ||  || — || November 25, 2006 || Mount Lemmon || Mount Lemmon Survey || — || align=right | 2.9 km || 
|-id=083 bgcolor=#E9E9E9
| 293083 ||  || — || November 24, 2006 || Kitt Peak || Spacewatch || — || align=right | 1.8 km || 
|-id=084 bgcolor=#E9E9E9
| 293084 ||  || — || November 25, 2006 || Kitt Peak || Spacewatch || — || align=right | 1.8 km || 
|-id=085 bgcolor=#d6d6d6
| 293085 ||  || — || November 27, 2006 || Kitt Peak || Spacewatch || — || align=right | 4.1 km || 
|-id=086 bgcolor=#fefefe
| 293086 ||  || — || November 27, 2006 || Kitt Peak || Spacewatch || V || align=right data-sort-value="0.88" | 880 m || 
|-id=087 bgcolor=#d6d6d6
| 293087 ||  || — || November 27, 2006 || Kitt Peak || Spacewatch || — || align=right | 3.0 km || 
|-id=088 bgcolor=#d6d6d6
| 293088 ||  || — || November 28, 2006 || Kitt Peak || Spacewatch || — || align=right | 4.4 km || 
|-id=089 bgcolor=#E9E9E9
| 293089 ||  || — || November 30, 2006 || Kitt Peak || Spacewatch || — || align=right | 1.1 km || 
|-id=090 bgcolor=#fefefe
| 293090 ||  || — || November 22, 2006 || Mount Lemmon || Mount Lemmon Survey || — || align=right | 1.1 km || 
|-id=091 bgcolor=#E9E9E9
| 293091 ||  || — || November 19, 2006 || Kitt Peak || Spacewatch || — || align=right | 2.0 km || 
|-id=092 bgcolor=#E9E9E9
| 293092 ||  || — || November 22, 2006 || Mount Lemmon || Mount Lemmon Survey || — || align=right | 2.7 km || 
|-id=093 bgcolor=#E9E9E9
| 293093 ||  || — || November 22, 2006 || Kitt Peak || Spacewatch || NEM || align=right | 2.7 km || 
|-id=094 bgcolor=#E9E9E9
| 293094 ||  || — || November 27, 2006 || Kitt Peak || Spacewatch || — || align=right | 2.8 km || 
|-id=095 bgcolor=#fefefe
| 293095 ||  || — || December 13, 2006 || Socorro || LINEAR || H || align=right data-sort-value="0.79" | 790 m || 
|-id=096 bgcolor=#fefefe
| 293096 ||  || — || December 14, 2006 || Socorro || LINEAR || H || align=right data-sort-value="0.78" | 780 m || 
|-id=097 bgcolor=#d6d6d6
| 293097 ||  || — || December 10, 2006 || Kitt Peak || Spacewatch || — || align=right | 6.9 km || 
|-id=098 bgcolor=#d6d6d6
| 293098 ||  || — || December 10, 2006 || Kitt Peak || Spacewatch || CRO || align=right | 4.2 km || 
|-id=099 bgcolor=#fefefe
| 293099 ||  || — || December 10, 2006 || Kitt Peak || Spacewatch || — || align=right | 1.2 km || 
|-id=100 bgcolor=#fefefe
| 293100 ||  || — || December 10, 2006 || Kitt Peak || Spacewatch || MAS || align=right data-sort-value="0.74" | 740 m || 
|}

293101–293200 

|-bgcolor=#E9E9E9
| 293101 ||  || — || December 10, 2006 || Kitt Peak || Spacewatch || — || align=right | 2.4 km || 
|-id=102 bgcolor=#d6d6d6
| 293102 ||  || — || December 10, 2006 || Kitt Peak || Spacewatch || — || align=right | 4.5 km || 
|-id=103 bgcolor=#E9E9E9
| 293103 ||  || — || December 10, 2006 || Kitt Peak || Spacewatch || — || align=right | 3.0 km || 
|-id=104 bgcolor=#E9E9E9
| 293104 ||  || — || December 10, 2006 || Kitt Peak || Spacewatch || — || align=right | 1.8 km || 
|-id=105 bgcolor=#E9E9E9
| 293105 ||  || — || December 11, 2006 || Kitt Peak || Spacewatch || — || align=right | 1.3 km || 
|-id=106 bgcolor=#fefefe
| 293106 ||  || — || December 12, 2006 || Kitt Peak || Spacewatch || — || align=right data-sort-value="0.85" | 850 m || 
|-id=107 bgcolor=#E9E9E9
| 293107 ||  || — || December 12, 2006 || Kitt Peak || Spacewatch || EUN || align=right | 1.8 km || 
|-id=108 bgcolor=#d6d6d6
| 293108 ||  || — || December 12, 2006 || Kitt Peak || Spacewatch || KOR || align=right | 1.6 km || 
|-id=109 bgcolor=#fefefe
| 293109 ||  || — || December 12, 2006 || Kitt Peak || Spacewatch || — || align=right | 1.2 km || 
|-id=110 bgcolor=#E9E9E9
| 293110 ||  || — || December 12, 2006 || Mount Lemmon || Mount Lemmon Survey || NEM || align=right | 3.1 km || 
|-id=111 bgcolor=#E9E9E9
| 293111 ||  || — || December 12, 2006 || Catalina || CSS || — || align=right | 1.8 km || 
|-id=112 bgcolor=#fefefe
| 293112 ||  || — || December 13, 2006 || Kitt Peak || Spacewatch || V || align=right data-sort-value="0.99" | 990 m || 
|-id=113 bgcolor=#d6d6d6
| 293113 ||  || — || December 13, 2006 || Mount Lemmon || Mount Lemmon Survey || — || align=right | 3.9 km || 
|-id=114 bgcolor=#d6d6d6
| 293114 ||  || — || December 13, 2006 || Mount Lemmon || Mount Lemmon Survey || KOR || align=right | 1.3 km || 
|-id=115 bgcolor=#E9E9E9
| 293115 ||  || — || December 13, 2006 || Mount Lemmon || Mount Lemmon Survey || — || align=right | 1.9 km || 
|-id=116 bgcolor=#E9E9E9
| 293116 ||  || — || December 11, 2006 || Kitt Peak || Spacewatch || — || align=right | 2.6 km || 
|-id=117 bgcolor=#fefefe
| 293117 ||  || — || December 11, 2006 || Kitt Peak || Spacewatch || V || align=right data-sort-value="0.79" | 790 m || 
|-id=118 bgcolor=#d6d6d6
| 293118 ||  || — || December 11, 2006 || Kitt Peak || Spacewatch || THM || align=right | 2.6 km || 
|-id=119 bgcolor=#E9E9E9
| 293119 ||  || — || December 11, 2006 || Catalina || CSS || — || align=right | 2.9 km || 
|-id=120 bgcolor=#fefefe
| 293120 ||  || — || December 11, 2006 || Kitt Peak || Spacewatch || — || align=right | 1.2 km || 
|-id=121 bgcolor=#d6d6d6
| 293121 ||  || — || December 11, 2006 || Kitt Peak || Spacewatch || — || align=right | 4.0 km || 
|-id=122 bgcolor=#d6d6d6
| 293122 ||  || — || December 13, 2006 || Kitt Peak || Spacewatch || KOR || align=right | 1.6 km || 
|-id=123 bgcolor=#d6d6d6
| 293123 ||  || — || December 13, 2006 || Kitt Peak || Spacewatch || THM || align=right | 2.1 km || 
|-id=124 bgcolor=#E9E9E9
| 293124 ||  || — || December 13, 2006 || Socorro || LINEAR || — || align=right | 1.4 km || 
|-id=125 bgcolor=#d6d6d6
| 293125 ||  || — || December 13, 2006 || Socorro || LINEAR || ALA || align=right | 6.3 km || 
|-id=126 bgcolor=#E9E9E9
| 293126 ||  || — || December 13, 2006 || Mount Lemmon || Mount Lemmon Survey || — || align=right | 2.8 km || 
|-id=127 bgcolor=#E9E9E9
| 293127 ||  || — || December 14, 2006 || Socorro || LINEAR || — || align=right | 2.2 km || 
|-id=128 bgcolor=#E9E9E9
| 293128 ||  || — || December 15, 2006 || Kitt Peak || Spacewatch || — || align=right | 2.6 km || 
|-id=129 bgcolor=#E9E9E9
| 293129 ||  || — || December 15, 2006 || Socorro || LINEAR || IAN || align=right | 1.3 km || 
|-id=130 bgcolor=#fefefe
| 293130 ||  || — || December 13, 2006 || Kitt Peak || Spacewatch || NYS || align=right | 1.1 km || 
|-id=131 bgcolor=#E9E9E9
| 293131 Meteora ||  ||  || December 15, 2006 || Vallemare di Borbona || V. S. Casulli || — || align=right | 1.5 km || 
|-id=132 bgcolor=#E9E9E9
| 293132 ||  || — || December 12, 2006 || Catalina || CSS || — || align=right | 3.8 km || 
|-id=133 bgcolor=#E9E9E9
| 293133 ||  || — || December 14, 2006 || Kitt Peak || Spacewatch || — || align=right | 2.7 km || 
|-id=134 bgcolor=#d6d6d6
| 293134 ||  || — || December 15, 2006 || Kitt Peak || Spacewatch || — || align=right | 3.8 km || 
|-id=135 bgcolor=#E9E9E9
| 293135 ||  || — || December 11, 2006 || Socorro || LINEAR || — || align=right | 3.1 km || 
|-id=136 bgcolor=#E9E9E9
| 293136 ||  || — || December 12, 2006 || Socorro || LINEAR || — || align=right | 2.2 km || 
|-id=137 bgcolor=#d6d6d6
| 293137 ||  || — || December 12, 2006 || Socorro || LINEAR || ALA || align=right | 7.0 km || 
|-id=138 bgcolor=#E9E9E9
| 293138 ||  || — || December 12, 2006 || Palomar || NEAT || MRX || align=right | 1.5 km || 
|-id=139 bgcolor=#E9E9E9
| 293139 ||  || — || December 12, 2006 || Palomar || NEAT || — || align=right | 2.3 km || 
|-id=140 bgcolor=#E9E9E9
| 293140 ||  || — || December 11, 2006 || Kitt Peak || Spacewatch || — || align=right | 1.5 km || 
|-id=141 bgcolor=#d6d6d6
| 293141 ||  || — || December 13, 2006 || Kitt Peak || Spacewatch || CHA || align=right | 2.8 km || 
|-id=142 bgcolor=#E9E9E9
| 293142 ||  || — || December 15, 2006 || Mount Lemmon || Mount Lemmon Survey || — || align=right | 2.4 km || 
|-id=143 bgcolor=#d6d6d6
| 293143 ||  || — || December 13, 2006 || Mount Lemmon || Mount Lemmon Survey || — || align=right | 2.4 km || 
|-id=144 bgcolor=#d6d6d6
| 293144 ||  || — || December 13, 2006 || Kitt Peak || Spacewatch || — || align=right | 3.8 km || 
|-id=145 bgcolor=#E9E9E9
| 293145 ||  || — || December 16, 2006 || Mount Lemmon || Mount Lemmon Survey || — || align=right | 2.1 km || 
|-id=146 bgcolor=#E9E9E9
| 293146 ||  || — || December 16, 2006 || Mount Lemmon || Mount Lemmon Survey || — || align=right | 1.8 km || 
|-id=147 bgcolor=#fefefe
| 293147 ||  || — || December 17, 2006 || Mount Lemmon || Mount Lemmon Survey || V || align=right data-sort-value="0.89" | 890 m || 
|-id=148 bgcolor=#fefefe
| 293148 ||  || — || December 17, 2006 || Mount Lemmon || Mount Lemmon Survey || MAS || align=right data-sort-value="0.79" | 790 m || 
|-id=149 bgcolor=#E9E9E9
| 293149 ||  || — || December 17, 2006 || Mount Lemmon || Mount Lemmon Survey || — || align=right | 2.4 km || 
|-id=150 bgcolor=#fefefe
| 293150 ||  || — || December 20, 2006 || Palomar || NEAT || — || align=right | 1.0 km || 
|-id=151 bgcolor=#d6d6d6
| 293151 ||  || — || December 20, 2006 || Mount Lemmon || Mount Lemmon Survey || THM || align=right | 2.3 km || 
|-id=152 bgcolor=#fefefe
| 293152 ||  || — || December 21, 2006 || Anderson Mesa || LONEOS || H || align=right data-sort-value="0.87" | 870 m || 
|-id=153 bgcolor=#d6d6d6
| 293153 ||  || — || December 22, 2006 || Črni Vrh || Črni Vrh || — || align=right | 4.9 km || 
|-id=154 bgcolor=#E9E9E9
| 293154 ||  || — || December 20, 2006 || Nyukasa || Mount Nyukasa Stn. || — || align=right | 3.2 km || 
|-id=155 bgcolor=#E9E9E9
| 293155 ||  || — || December 24, 2006 || Gnosca || S. Sposetti || — || align=right | 1.1 km || 
|-id=156 bgcolor=#E9E9E9
| 293156 ||  || — || December 25, 2006 || Gnosca || S. Sposetti || KON || align=right | 3.1 km || 
|-id=157 bgcolor=#d6d6d6
| 293157 ||  || — || December 20, 2006 || Palomar || NEAT || — || align=right | 5.8 km || 
|-id=158 bgcolor=#E9E9E9
| 293158 ||  || — || December 20, 2006 || Palomar || NEAT || — || align=right | 1.6 km || 
|-id=159 bgcolor=#d6d6d6
| 293159 ||  || — || December 21, 2006 || Mount Lemmon || Mount Lemmon Survey || — || align=right | 5.0 km || 
|-id=160 bgcolor=#d6d6d6
| 293160 ||  || — || December 22, 2006 || Mount Lemmon || Mount Lemmon Survey || — || align=right | 5.2 km || 
|-id=161 bgcolor=#fefefe
| 293161 ||  || — || December 21, 2006 || Kitt Peak || Spacewatch || MAS || align=right data-sort-value="0.81" | 810 m || 
|-id=162 bgcolor=#E9E9E9
| 293162 ||  || — || December 21, 2006 || Kitt Peak || Spacewatch || — || align=right | 2.0 km || 
|-id=163 bgcolor=#E9E9E9
| 293163 ||  || — || December 21, 2006 || Kitt Peak || Spacewatch || — || align=right | 1.5 km || 
|-id=164 bgcolor=#E9E9E9
| 293164 ||  || — || December 21, 2006 || Kitt Peak || Spacewatch || — || align=right | 2.4 km || 
|-id=165 bgcolor=#fefefe
| 293165 ||  || — || December 21, 2006 || Kitt Peak || Spacewatch || MAS || align=right data-sort-value="0.69" | 690 m || 
|-id=166 bgcolor=#E9E9E9
| 293166 ||  || — || December 21, 2006 || Kitt Peak || Spacewatch || AGN || align=right | 1.4 km || 
|-id=167 bgcolor=#E9E9E9
| 293167 ||  || — || December 21, 2006 || Kitt Peak || Spacewatch || — || align=right | 1.4 km || 
|-id=168 bgcolor=#d6d6d6
| 293168 ||  || — || December 22, 2006 || Socorro || LINEAR || — || align=right | 3.7 km || 
|-id=169 bgcolor=#E9E9E9
| 293169 ||  || — || December 23, 2006 || Mount Lemmon || Mount Lemmon Survey || — || align=right | 2.0 km || 
|-id=170 bgcolor=#d6d6d6
| 293170 ||  || — || December 24, 2006 || Catalina || CSS || — || align=right | 5.1 km || 
|-id=171 bgcolor=#E9E9E9
| 293171 ||  || — || December 24, 2006 || Kitt Peak || Spacewatch || — || align=right | 1.3 km || 
|-id=172 bgcolor=#fefefe
| 293172 ||  || — || December 24, 2006 || Kitt Peak || Spacewatch || MAS || align=right data-sort-value="0.84" | 840 m || 
|-id=173 bgcolor=#E9E9E9
| 293173 ||  || — || December 27, 2006 || Mount Lemmon || Mount Lemmon Survey || — || align=right | 1.5 km || 
|-id=174 bgcolor=#fefefe
| 293174 ||  || — || December 27, 2006 || Mount Lemmon || Mount Lemmon Survey || NYS || align=right data-sort-value="0.84" | 840 m || 
|-id=175 bgcolor=#E9E9E9
| 293175 ||  || — || December 27, 2006 || Mount Lemmon || Mount Lemmon Survey || — || align=right | 2.4 km || 
|-id=176 bgcolor=#E9E9E9
| 293176 ||  || — || December 16, 2006 || Kitt Peak || Spacewatch || — || align=right | 1.7 km || 
|-id=177 bgcolor=#E9E9E9
| 293177 ||  || — || January 8, 2007 || Catalina || CSS || — || align=right | 2.2 km || 
|-id=178 bgcolor=#d6d6d6
| 293178 ||  || — || January 9, 2007 || Kitt Peak || Spacewatch || 7:4 || align=right | 5.7 km || 
|-id=179 bgcolor=#fefefe
| 293179 ||  || — || January 10, 2007 || Socorro || LINEAR || — || align=right | 1.2 km || 
|-id=180 bgcolor=#E9E9E9
| 293180 ||  || — || January 9, 2007 || Kitt Peak || Spacewatch || — || align=right | 1.5 km || 
|-id=181 bgcolor=#d6d6d6
| 293181 ||  || — || January 15, 2007 || Kitt Peak || Spacewatch || — || align=right | 2.3 km || 
|-id=182 bgcolor=#d6d6d6
| 293182 ||  || — || January 10, 2007 || Mount Lemmon || Mount Lemmon Survey || EOS || align=right | 2.9 km || 
|-id=183 bgcolor=#fefefe
| 293183 ||  || — || January 10, 2007 || Mount Lemmon || Mount Lemmon Survey || V || align=right data-sort-value="0.78" | 780 m || 
|-id=184 bgcolor=#d6d6d6
| 293184 ||  || — || January 15, 2007 || Catalina || CSS || — || align=right | 5.4 km || 
|-id=185 bgcolor=#E9E9E9
| 293185 ||  || — || January 15, 2007 || Anderson Mesa || LONEOS || — || align=right | 2.6 km || 
|-id=186 bgcolor=#E9E9E9
| 293186 ||  || — || January 15, 2007 || Catalina || CSS || NEM || align=right | 2.7 km || 
|-id=187 bgcolor=#fefefe
| 293187 ||  || — || January 15, 2007 || Catalina || CSS || — || align=right | 1.0 km || 
|-id=188 bgcolor=#E9E9E9
| 293188 ||  || — || January 15, 2007 || Anderson Mesa || LONEOS || EUN || align=right | 1.8 km || 
|-id=189 bgcolor=#E9E9E9
| 293189 ||  || — || January 15, 2007 || Catalina || CSS || — || align=right | 2.5 km || 
|-id=190 bgcolor=#E9E9E9
| 293190 ||  || — || January 10, 2007 || Mount Lemmon || Mount Lemmon Survey || MRX || align=right | 1.1 km || 
|-id=191 bgcolor=#d6d6d6
| 293191 ||  || — || January 10, 2007 || Mount Lemmon || Mount Lemmon Survey || — || align=right | 3.9 km || 
|-id=192 bgcolor=#E9E9E9
| 293192 ||  || — || January 9, 2007 || Mount Lemmon || Mount Lemmon Survey || — || align=right | 1.0 km || 
|-id=193 bgcolor=#d6d6d6
| 293193 ||  || — || January 10, 2007 || Mount Lemmon || Mount Lemmon Survey || — || align=right | 3.4 km || 
|-id=194 bgcolor=#E9E9E9
| 293194 ||  || — || January 10, 2007 || Mount Lemmon || Mount Lemmon Survey || MRX || align=right | 1.0 km || 
|-id=195 bgcolor=#d6d6d6
| 293195 ||  || — || January 16, 2007 || Catalina || CSS || HYG || align=right | 4.6 km || 
|-id=196 bgcolor=#fefefe
| 293196 ||  || — || January 17, 2007 || Catalina || CSS || H || align=right data-sort-value="0.77" | 770 m || 
|-id=197 bgcolor=#d6d6d6
| 293197 ||  || — || January 17, 2007 || Palomar || NEAT || TIR || align=right | 4.0 km || 
|-id=198 bgcolor=#E9E9E9
| 293198 ||  || — || January 17, 2007 || Kitt Peak || Spacewatch || — || align=right | 2.4 km || 
|-id=199 bgcolor=#E9E9E9
| 293199 ||  || — || January 17, 2007 || Catalina || CSS || — || align=right | 2.5 km || 
|-id=200 bgcolor=#fefefe
| 293200 ||  || — || January 17, 2007 || Palomar || NEAT || — || align=right | 1.0 km || 
|}

293201–293300 

|-bgcolor=#E9E9E9
| 293201 ||  || — || January 17, 2007 || Kitt Peak || Spacewatch || RAF || align=right | 1.1 km || 
|-id=202 bgcolor=#d6d6d6
| 293202 ||  || — || January 17, 2007 || Kitt Peak || Spacewatch || — || align=right | 3.2 km || 
|-id=203 bgcolor=#d6d6d6
| 293203 ||  || — || January 17, 2007 || Kitt Peak || Spacewatch || KOR || align=right | 1.6 km || 
|-id=204 bgcolor=#d6d6d6
| 293204 ||  || — || January 17, 2007 || Kitt Peak || Spacewatch || KOR || align=right | 1.4 km || 
|-id=205 bgcolor=#E9E9E9
| 293205 ||  || — || January 17, 2007 || Kitt Peak || Spacewatch || — || align=right | 2.6 km || 
|-id=206 bgcolor=#d6d6d6
| 293206 ||  || — || January 17, 2007 || Palomar || NEAT || — || align=right | 3.8 km || 
|-id=207 bgcolor=#E9E9E9
| 293207 ||  || — || January 17, 2007 || Kitt Peak || Spacewatch || — || align=right | 3.6 km || 
|-id=208 bgcolor=#E9E9E9
| 293208 ||  || — || January 17, 2007 || Palomar || NEAT || — || align=right | 2.5 km || 
|-id=209 bgcolor=#E9E9E9
| 293209 ||  || — || January 21, 2007 || Socorro || LINEAR || ADE || align=right | 2.6 km || 
|-id=210 bgcolor=#fefefe
| 293210 ||  || — || January 23, 2007 || Anderson Mesa || LONEOS || PHO || align=right | 1.4 km || 
|-id=211 bgcolor=#d6d6d6
| 293211 ||  || — || January 18, 2007 || Palomar || NEAT || — || align=right | 4.2 km || 
|-id=212 bgcolor=#E9E9E9
| 293212 ||  || — || January 24, 2007 || Socorro || LINEAR || GEF || align=right | 1.7 km || 
|-id=213 bgcolor=#d6d6d6
| 293213 ||  || — || January 24, 2007 || Mount Lemmon || Mount Lemmon Survey || — || align=right | 4.2 km || 
|-id=214 bgcolor=#d6d6d6
| 293214 ||  || — || January 24, 2007 || Mount Lemmon || Mount Lemmon Survey || — || align=right | 2.4 km || 
|-id=215 bgcolor=#E9E9E9
| 293215 ||  || — || January 24, 2007 || Catalina || CSS || WIT || align=right | 1.6 km || 
|-id=216 bgcolor=#E9E9E9
| 293216 ||  || — || January 24, 2007 || Mount Lemmon || Mount Lemmon Survey || — || align=right | 1.9 km || 
|-id=217 bgcolor=#E9E9E9
| 293217 ||  || — || January 24, 2007 || Mount Lemmon || Mount Lemmon Survey || HNA || align=right | 3.1 km || 
|-id=218 bgcolor=#E9E9E9
| 293218 ||  || — || January 24, 2007 || Mount Lemmon || Mount Lemmon Survey || — || align=right | 1.7 km || 
|-id=219 bgcolor=#d6d6d6
| 293219 ||  || — || January 24, 2007 || Socorro || LINEAR || — || align=right | 3.4 km || 
|-id=220 bgcolor=#E9E9E9
| 293220 ||  || — || January 24, 2007 || Mount Lemmon || Mount Lemmon Survey || HEN || align=right | 1.3 km || 
|-id=221 bgcolor=#fefefe
| 293221 ||  || — || January 24, 2007 || Catalina || CSS || — || align=right data-sort-value="0.80" | 800 m || 
|-id=222 bgcolor=#E9E9E9
| 293222 ||  || — || January 24, 2007 || Mount Lemmon || Mount Lemmon Survey || — || align=right | 2.3 km || 
|-id=223 bgcolor=#d6d6d6
| 293223 ||  || — || January 24, 2007 || Mount Lemmon || Mount Lemmon Survey || K-2 || align=right | 1.3 km || 
|-id=224 bgcolor=#E9E9E9
| 293224 ||  || — || January 24, 2007 || Catalina || CSS || — || align=right | 1.3 km || 
|-id=225 bgcolor=#E9E9E9
| 293225 ||  || — || January 27, 2007 || Kitt Peak || Spacewatch || — || align=right | 2.1 km || 
|-id=226 bgcolor=#d6d6d6
| 293226 ||  || — || January 24, 2007 || Socorro || LINEAR || EOS || align=right | 2.4 km || 
|-id=227 bgcolor=#d6d6d6
| 293227 ||  || — || January 24, 2007 || Catalina || CSS || 7:4 || align=right | 6.0 km || 
|-id=228 bgcolor=#d6d6d6
| 293228 ||  || — || January 25, 2007 || Catalina || CSS || HYG || align=right | 3.4 km || 
|-id=229 bgcolor=#d6d6d6
| 293229 ||  || — || January 26, 2007 || Kitt Peak || Spacewatch || — || align=right | 2.9 km || 
|-id=230 bgcolor=#E9E9E9
| 293230 ||  || — || January 27, 2007 || Mount Lemmon || Mount Lemmon Survey || NEM || align=right | 2.4 km || 
|-id=231 bgcolor=#E9E9E9
| 293231 ||  || — || January 27, 2007 || Mount Lemmon || Mount Lemmon Survey || — || align=right | 1.9 km || 
|-id=232 bgcolor=#E9E9E9
| 293232 ||  || — || January 27, 2007 || Mount Lemmon || Mount Lemmon Survey || — || align=right | 2.9 km || 
|-id=233 bgcolor=#fefefe
| 293233 ||  || — || January 27, 2007 || Mount Lemmon || Mount Lemmon Survey || — || align=right data-sort-value="0.78" | 780 m || 
|-id=234 bgcolor=#E9E9E9
| 293234 ||  || — || January 27, 2007 || Kitt Peak || Spacewatch || — || align=right | 4.2 km || 
|-id=235 bgcolor=#E9E9E9
| 293235 ||  || — || January 27, 2007 || Mount Lemmon || Mount Lemmon Survey || HOF || align=right | 3.2 km || 
|-id=236 bgcolor=#d6d6d6
| 293236 ||  || — || January 27, 2007 || Mount Lemmon || Mount Lemmon Survey || KOR || align=right | 1.7 km || 
|-id=237 bgcolor=#E9E9E9
| 293237 ||  || — || January 27, 2007 || Kitt Peak || Spacewatch || — || align=right | 1.3 km || 
|-id=238 bgcolor=#fefefe
| 293238 ||  || — || January 27, 2007 || Mount Lemmon || Mount Lemmon Survey || — || align=right data-sort-value="0.76" | 760 m || 
|-id=239 bgcolor=#E9E9E9
| 293239 ||  || — || January 28, 2007 || Mount Lemmon || Mount Lemmon Survey || — || align=right | 1.8 km || 
|-id=240 bgcolor=#E9E9E9
| 293240 ||  || — || January 17, 2007 || Mount Lemmon || Mount Lemmon Survey || AEO || align=right | 1.2 km || 
|-id=241 bgcolor=#d6d6d6
| 293241 ||  || — || January 28, 2007 || Mount Lemmon || Mount Lemmon Survey || — || align=right | 3.7 km || 
|-id=242 bgcolor=#d6d6d6
| 293242 ||  || — || January 29, 2007 || Kitt Peak || Spacewatch || — || align=right | 2.4 km || 
|-id=243 bgcolor=#d6d6d6
| 293243 ||  || — || January 28, 2007 || Mount Lemmon || Mount Lemmon Survey || — || align=right | 4.6 km || 
|-id=244 bgcolor=#E9E9E9
| 293244 ||  || — || January 28, 2007 || Mount Lemmon || Mount Lemmon Survey || — || align=right | 1.7 km || 
|-id=245 bgcolor=#d6d6d6
| 293245 ||  || — || January 27, 2007 || Mount Lemmon || Mount Lemmon Survey || — || align=right | 2.6 km || 
|-id=246 bgcolor=#E9E9E9
| 293246 ||  || — || January 17, 2007 || Kitt Peak || Spacewatch || HEN || align=right | 1.4 km || 
|-id=247 bgcolor=#d6d6d6
| 293247 ||  || — || January 27, 2007 || Kitt Peak || Spacewatch || THM || align=right | 3.0 km || 
|-id=248 bgcolor=#E9E9E9
| 293248 ||  || — || February 6, 2007 || Kitt Peak || Spacewatch || — || align=right | 3.9 km || 
|-id=249 bgcolor=#d6d6d6
| 293249 ||  || — || February 6, 2007 || Mount Lemmon || Mount Lemmon Survey || — || align=right | 3.7 km || 
|-id=250 bgcolor=#E9E9E9
| 293250 ||  || — || February 6, 2007 || Kitt Peak || Spacewatch || AGN || align=right | 1.7 km || 
|-id=251 bgcolor=#E9E9E9
| 293251 ||  || — || February 6, 2007 || Kitt Peak || Spacewatch || — || align=right | 1.0 km || 
|-id=252 bgcolor=#E9E9E9
| 293252 ||  || — || February 6, 2007 || Kitt Peak || Spacewatch || AGN || align=right | 1.7 km || 
|-id=253 bgcolor=#d6d6d6
| 293253 ||  || — || February 6, 2007 || Kitt Peak || Spacewatch || URS || align=right | 4.4 km || 
|-id=254 bgcolor=#E9E9E9
| 293254 ||  || — || February 6, 2007 || Kitt Peak || Spacewatch || — || align=right | 1.7 km || 
|-id=255 bgcolor=#E9E9E9
| 293255 ||  || — || February 6, 2007 || Kitt Peak || Spacewatch || — || align=right data-sort-value="0.94" | 940 m || 
|-id=256 bgcolor=#d6d6d6
| 293256 ||  || — || February 6, 2007 || Mount Lemmon || Mount Lemmon Survey || KOR || align=right | 1.6 km || 
|-id=257 bgcolor=#E9E9E9
| 293257 ||  || — || February 7, 2007 || Mount Lemmon || Mount Lemmon Survey || — || align=right | 2.8 km || 
|-id=258 bgcolor=#E9E9E9
| 293258 ||  || — || February 5, 2007 || Palomar || NEAT || INO || align=right | 1.5 km || 
|-id=259 bgcolor=#d6d6d6
| 293259 ||  || — || February 8, 2007 || Mount Lemmon || Mount Lemmon Survey || VER || align=right | 4.1 km || 
|-id=260 bgcolor=#fefefe
| 293260 ||  || — || February 9, 2007 || 7300 || W. K. Y. Yeung || — || align=right data-sort-value="0.79" | 790 m || 
|-id=261 bgcolor=#E9E9E9
| 293261 ||  || — || February 6, 2007 || Mount Lemmon || Mount Lemmon Survey || — || align=right | 3.0 km || 
|-id=262 bgcolor=#d6d6d6
| 293262 ||  || — || February 6, 2007 || Palomar || NEAT || — || align=right | 3.8 km || 
|-id=263 bgcolor=#E9E9E9
| 293263 ||  || — || February 6, 2007 || Mount Lemmon || Mount Lemmon Survey || JNS || align=right | 3.2 km || 
|-id=264 bgcolor=#E9E9E9
| 293264 ||  || — || February 8, 2007 || Mount Lemmon || Mount Lemmon Survey || — || align=right | 3.0 km || 
|-id=265 bgcolor=#d6d6d6
| 293265 ||  || — || February 8, 2007 || Mount Lemmon || Mount Lemmon Survey || EOS || align=right | 3.0 km || 
|-id=266 bgcolor=#d6d6d6
| 293266 ||  || — || February 8, 2007 || Kitt Peak || Spacewatch || EUP || align=right | 6.1 km || 
|-id=267 bgcolor=#E9E9E9
| 293267 ||  || — || February 9, 2007 || Kitt Peak || Spacewatch || — || align=right | 1.9 km || 
|-id=268 bgcolor=#fefefe
| 293268 ||  || — || February 6, 2007 || Mount Lemmon || Mount Lemmon Survey || MAS || align=right data-sort-value="0.64" | 640 m || 
|-id=269 bgcolor=#E9E9E9
| 293269 ||  || — || February 6, 2007 || Mount Lemmon || Mount Lemmon Survey || — || align=right | 2.9 km || 
|-id=270 bgcolor=#E9E9E9
| 293270 ||  || — || February 6, 2007 || Mount Lemmon || Mount Lemmon Survey || — || align=right | 2.7 km || 
|-id=271 bgcolor=#E9E9E9
| 293271 ||  || — || February 6, 2007 || Mount Lemmon || Mount Lemmon Survey || — || align=right | 2.6 km || 
|-id=272 bgcolor=#E9E9E9
| 293272 ||  || — || February 7, 2007 || Kitt Peak || Spacewatch || — || align=right | 1.2 km || 
|-id=273 bgcolor=#E9E9E9
| 293273 ||  || — || February 8, 2007 || Kitt Peak || Spacewatch || — || align=right | 2.4 km || 
|-id=274 bgcolor=#E9E9E9
| 293274 ||  || — || February 8, 2007 || Palomar || NEAT || — || align=right | 2.6 km || 
|-id=275 bgcolor=#E9E9E9
| 293275 ||  || — || February 8, 2007 || Palomar || NEAT || — || align=right | 2.0 km || 
|-id=276 bgcolor=#d6d6d6
| 293276 ||  || — || February 10, 2007 || Mount Lemmon || Mount Lemmon Survey || — || align=right | 3.6 km || 
|-id=277 bgcolor=#d6d6d6
| 293277 ||  || — || February 10, 2007 || Mount Lemmon || Mount Lemmon Survey || EOS || align=right | 1.6 km || 
|-id=278 bgcolor=#E9E9E9
| 293278 ||  || — || February 9, 2007 || Kitt Peak || Spacewatch || — || align=right | 2.5 km || 
|-id=279 bgcolor=#E9E9E9
| 293279 ||  || — || February 14, 2007 || Lulin Observatory || C.-S. Lin, Q.-z. Ye || — || align=right | 1.0 km || 
|-id=280 bgcolor=#d6d6d6
| 293280 ||  || — || February 13, 2007 || Mount Lemmon || Mount Lemmon Survey || — || align=right | 5.3 km || 
|-id=281 bgcolor=#E9E9E9
| 293281 ||  || — || November 15, 2006 || Mount Lemmon || Mount Lemmon Survey || — || align=right | 2.1 km || 
|-id=282 bgcolor=#E9E9E9
| 293282 ||  || — || February 10, 2007 || Palomar || NEAT || — || align=right | 2.8 km || 
|-id=283 bgcolor=#E9E9E9
| 293283 ||  || — || February 10, 2007 || Catalina || CSS || — || align=right | 1.7 km || 
|-id=284 bgcolor=#d6d6d6
| 293284 ||  || — || February 10, 2007 || Catalina || CSS || VER || align=right | 4.2 km || 
|-id=285 bgcolor=#E9E9E9
| 293285 ||  || — || February 15, 2007 || Catalina || CSS || — || align=right | 3.4 km || 
|-id=286 bgcolor=#d6d6d6
| 293286 || 2007 DM || — || February 16, 2007 || Wildberg || R. Apitzsch || 628 || align=right | 2.1 km || 
|-id=287 bgcolor=#E9E9E9
| 293287 ||  || — || February 16, 2007 || Mount Lemmon || Mount Lemmon Survey || — || align=right | 1.3 km || 
|-id=288 bgcolor=#d6d6d6
| 293288 ||  || — || February 16, 2007 || Mount Lemmon || Mount Lemmon Survey || — || align=right | 3.4 km || 
|-id=289 bgcolor=#E9E9E9
| 293289 ||  || — || February 18, 2007 || Socorro || LINEAR || — || align=right | 2.8 km || 
|-id=290 bgcolor=#d6d6d6
| 293290 ||  || — || February 17, 2007 || Mount Lemmon || Mount Lemmon Survey || EOS || align=right | 2.5 km || 
|-id=291 bgcolor=#E9E9E9
| 293291 ||  || — || February 16, 2007 || Palomar || NEAT || — || align=right | 1.7 km || 
|-id=292 bgcolor=#E9E9E9
| 293292 ||  || — || February 17, 2007 || Kitt Peak || Spacewatch || WIT || align=right | 1.2 km || 
|-id=293 bgcolor=#d6d6d6
| 293293 ||  || — || February 17, 2007 || Kitt Peak || Spacewatch || — || align=right | 2.9 km || 
|-id=294 bgcolor=#d6d6d6
| 293294 ||  || — || February 17, 2007 || Kitt Peak || Spacewatch || EOS || align=right | 2.2 km || 
|-id=295 bgcolor=#E9E9E9
| 293295 ||  || — || February 17, 2007 || Kitt Peak || Spacewatch || — || align=right | 1.3 km || 
|-id=296 bgcolor=#E9E9E9
| 293296 ||  || — || February 17, 2007 || Kitt Peak || Spacewatch || — || align=right | 1.5 km || 
|-id=297 bgcolor=#d6d6d6
| 293297 ||  || — || February 17, 2007 || Kitt Peak || Spacewatch || — || align=right | 2.8 km || 
|-id=298 bgcolor=#E9E9E9
| 293298 ||  || — || February 17, 2007 || Kitt Peak || Spacewatch || — || align=right | 2.5 km || 
|-id=299 bgcolor=#fefefe
| 293299 ||  || — || February 17, 2007 || Kitt Peak || Spacewatch || — || align=right data-sort-value="0.62" | 620 m || 
|-id=300 bgcolor=#d6d6d6
| 293300 ||  || — || February 17, 2007 || Kitt Peak || Spacewatch || — || align=right | 3.3 km || 
|}

293301–293400 

|-bgcolor=#d6d6d6
| 293301 ||  || — || February 17, 2007 || Kitt Peak || Spacewatch || — || align=right | 3.4 km || 
|-id=302 bgcolor=#d6d6d6
| 293302 ||  || — || February 17, 2007 || Kitt Peak || Spacewatch || EOS || align=right | 2.5 km || 
|-id=303 bgcolor=#E9E9E9
| 293303 ||  || — || February 17, 2007 || Kitt Peak || Spacewatch || — || align=right | 2.0 km || 
|-id=304 bgcolor=#d6d6d6
| 293304 ||  || — || February 17, 2007 || Kitt Peak || Spacewatch || — || align=right | 3.3 km || 
|-id=305 bgcolor=#E9E9E9
| 293305 ||  || — || February 17, 2007 || Kitt Peak || Spacewatch || — || align=right | 2.3 km || 
|-id=306 bgcolor=#E9E9E9
| 293306 ||  || — || February 17, 2007 || Kitt Peak || Spacewatch || — || align=right | 1.9 km || 
|-id=307 bgcolor=#C2FFFF
| 293307 ||  || — || February 17, 2007 || Kitt Peak || Spacewatch || L5 || align=right | 9.6 km || 
|-id=308 bgcolor=#E9E9E9
| 293308 ||  || — || February 17, 2007 || Kitt Peak || Spacewatch || — || align=right | 2.1 km || 
|-id=309 bgcolor=#d6d6d6
| 293309 ||  || — || February 17, 2007 || Kitt Peak || Spacewatch || — || align=right | 2.9 km || 
|-id=310 bgcolor=#E9E9E9
| 293310 ||  || — || February 21, 2007 || Calvin-Rehoboth || Calvin–Rehoboth Obs. || RAF || align=right data-sort-value="0.85" | 850 m || 
|-id=311 bgcolor=#d6d6d6
| 293311 ||  || — || February 16, 2007 || Mount Lemmon || Mount Lemmon Survey || — || align=right | 3.2 km || 
|-id=312 bgcolor=#E9E9E9
| 293312 ||  || — || February 17, 2007 || Catalina || CSS || — || align=right | 2.3 km || 
|-id=313 bgcolor=#d6d6d6
| 293313 ||  || — || February 19, 2007 || Kitt Peak || Spacewatch || — || align=right | 3.8 km || 
|-id=314 bgcolor=#E9E9E9
| 293314 ||  || — || February 19, 2007 || Mount Lemmon || Mount Lemmon Survey || — || align=right | 1.6 km || 
|-id=315 bgcolor=#d6d6d6
| 293315 ||  || — || February 21, 2007 || Socorro || LINEAR || — || align=right | 3.4 km || 
|-id=316 bgcolor=#E9E9E9
| 293316 ||  || — || February 21, 2007 || Mount Lemmon || Mount Lemmon Survey || — || align=right data-sort-value="0.91" | 910 m || 
|-id=317 bgcolor=#E9E9E9
| 293317 ||  || — || February 17, 2007 || Kitt Peak || Spacewatch || — || align=right | 2.3 km || 
|-id=318 bgcolor=#E9E9E9
| 293318 ||  || — || February 17, 2007 || Kitt Peak || Spacewatch || — || align=right | 2.3 km || 
|-id=319 bgcolor=#E9E9E9
| 293319 ||  || — || February 17, 2007 || Catalina || CSS || — || align=right | 1.1 km || 
|-id=320 bgcolor=#d6d6d6
| 293320 ||  || — || February 19, 2007 || Mount Lemmon || Mount Lemmon Survey || — || align=right | 3.1 km || 
|-id=321 bgcolor=#d6d6d6
| 293321 ||  || — || February 19, 2007 || Mount Lemmon || Mount Lemmon Survey || — || align=right | 5.5 km || 
|-id=322 bgcolor=#d6d6d6
| 293322 ||  || — || February 21, 2007 || Socorro || LINEAR || — || align=right | 4.2 km || 
|-id=323 bgcolor=#E9E9E9
| 293323 ||  || — || February 21, 2007 || Kitt Peak || Spacewatch || — || align=right | 2.0 km || 
|-id=324 bgcolor=#E9E9E9
| 293324 ||  || — || February 21, 2007 || Kitt Peak || Spacewatch || MRX || align=right | 1.1 km || 
|-id=325 bgcolor=#d6d6d6
| 293325 ||  || — || February 21, 2007 || Kitt Peak || Spacewatch || — || align=right | 3.2 km || 
|-id=326 bgcolor=#d6d6d6
| 293326 ||  || — || February 21, 2007 || Kitt Peak || Spacewatch || — || align=right | 3.4 km || 
|-id=327 bgcolor=#E9E9E9
| 293327 ||  || — || February 21, 2007 || Socorro || LINEAR || — || align=right | 1.6 km || 
|-id=328 bgcolor=#fefefe
| 293328 ||  || — || February 21, 2007 || Socorro || LINEAR || — || align=right | 1.6 km || 
|-id=329 bgcolor=#d6d6d6
| 293329 ||  || — || February 21, 2007 || Kitt Peak || Spacewatch || THM || align=right | 3.3 km || 
|-id=330 bgcolor=#d6d6d6
| 293330 ||  || — || February 21, 2007 || Kitt Peak || Spacewatch || — || align=right | 2.8 km || 
|-id=331 bgcolor=#C2FFFF
| 293331 ||  || — || February 21, 2007 || Kitt Peak || Spacewatch || L5 || align=right | 9.6 km || 
|-id=332 bgcolor=#d6d6d6
| 293332 ||  || — || February 21, 2007 || Kitt Peak || Spacewatch || — || align=right | 2.9 km || 
|-id=333 bgcolor=#E9E9E9
| 293333 ||  || — || February 21, 2007 || Kitt Peak || Spacewatch || — || align=right | 1.5 km || 
|-id=334 bgcolor=#d6d6d6
| 293334 ||  || — || February 22, 2007 || Catalina || CSS || EOS || align=right | 2.1 km || 
|-id=335 bgcolor=#E9E9E9
| 293335 ||  || — || February 23, 2007 || Mount Lemmon || Mount Lemmon Survey || — || align=right | 1.5 km || 
|-id=336 bgcolor=#d6d6d6
| 293336 ||  || — || February 23, 2007 || Mount Lemmon || Mount Lemmon Survey || — || align=right | 3.4 km || 
|-id=337 bgcolor=#d6d6d6
| 293337 ||  || — || February 23, 2007 || Mount Lemmon || Mount Lemmon Survey || SYL7:4 || align=right | 6.0 km || 
|-id=338 bgcolor=#d6d6d6
| 293338 ||  || — || February 23, 2007 || Kitt Peak || Spacewatch || THM || align=right | 3.0 km || 
|-id=339 bgcolor=#d6d6d6
| 293339 ||  || — || February 23, 2007 || Kitt Peak || Spacewatch || — || align=right | 3.8 km || 
|-id=340 bgcolor=#d6d6d6
| 293340 ||  || — || February 23, 2007 || Kitt Peak || Spacewatch || KOR || align=right | 1.6 km || 
|-id=341 bgcolor=#d6d6d6
| 293341 ||  || — || February 23, 2007 || Kitt Peak || Spacewatch || KOR || align=right | 1.8 km || 
|-id=342 bgcolor=#d6d6d6
| 293342 ||  || — || February 23, 2007 || Kitt Peak || Spacewatch || — || align=right | 4.5 km || 
|-id=343 bgcolor=#d6d6d6
| 293343 ||  || — || February 25, 2007 || Mount Lemmon || Mount Lemmon Survey || — || align=right | 3.6 km || 
|-id=344 bgcolor=#E9E9E9
| 293344 ||  || — || February 25, 2007 || Kitt Peak || Spacewatch || MRX || align=right | 1.3 km || 
|-id=345 bgcolor=#fefefe
| 293345 ||  || — || February 21, 2007 || Mount Lemmon || Mount Lemmon Survey || NYS || align=right data-sort-value="0.83" | 830 m || 
|-id=346 bgcolor=#d6d6d6
| 293346 ||  || — || February 26, 2007 || Mount Lemmon || Mount Lemmon Survey || 7:4 || align=right | 4.8 km || 
|-id=347 bgcolor=#E9E9E9
| 293347 ||  || — || February 17, 2007 || Kitt Peak || Spacewatch || HEN || align=right | 1.00 km || 
|-id=348 bgcolor=#d6d6d6
| 293348 ||  || — || February 21, 2007 || Mount Lemmon || Mount Lemmon Survey || — || align=right | 2.6 km || 
|-id=349 bgcolor=#E9E9E9
| 293349 ||  || — || February 22, 2007 || Kitt Peak || Spacewatch || RAF || align=right data-sort-value="0.96" | 960 m || 
|-id=350 bgcolor=#d6d6d6
| 293350 ||  || — || February 23, 2007 || Kitt Peak || Spacewatch || HYG || align=right | 3.4 km || 
|-id=351 bgcolor=#fefefe
| 293351 ||  || — || February 22, 2007 || Catalina || CSS || H || align=right data-sort-value="0.80" | 800 m || 
|-id=352 bgcolor=#d6d6d6
| 293352 ||  || — || February 19, 2007 || Mount Lemmon || Mount Lemmon Survey || KOR || align=right | 1.5 km || 
|-id=353 bgcolor=#E9E9E9
| 293353 ||  || — || February 25, 2007 || Mount Lemmon || Mount Lemmon Survey || — || align=right data-sort-value="0.94" | 940 m || 
|-id=354 bgcolor=#d6d6d6
| 293354 ||  || — || February 27, 2007 || Kitt Peak || Spacewatch || — || align=right | 2.5 km || 
|-id=355 bgcolor=#E9E9E9
| 293355 ||  || — || February 17, 2007 || Mount Lemmon || Mount Lemmon Survey || — || align=right | 1.6 km || 
|-id=356 bgcolor=#fefefe
| 293356 ||  || — || February 25, 2007 || Mount Lemmon || Mount Lemmon Survey || — || align=right data-sort-value="0.97" | 970 m || 
|-id=357 bgcolor=#d6d6d6
| 293357 ||  || — || February 17, 2007 || Mount Lemmon || Mount Lemmon Survey || EOS || align=right | 2.8 km || 
|-id=358 bgcolor=#fefefe
| 293358 ||  || — || February 21, 2007 || Mount Lemmon || Mount Lemmon Survey || SUL || align=right | 2.5 km || 
|-id=359 bgcolor=#E9E9E9
| 293359 ||  || — || March 7, 2007 || Wildberg || R. Apitzsch || — || align=right data-sort-value="0.99" | 990 m || 
|-id=360 bgcolor=#d6d6d6
| 293360 ||  || — || March 9, 2007 || Kitt Peak || Spacewatch || — || align=right | 2.8 km || 
|-id=361 bgcolor=#fefefe
| 293361 ||  || — || March 9, 2007 || Catalina || CSS || — || align=right data-sort-value="0.78" | 780 m || 
|-id=362 bgcolor=#d6d6d6
| 293362 ||  || — || March 9, 2007 || Mount Lemmon || Mount Lemmon Survey || KOR || align=right | 1.4 km || 
|-id=363 bgcolor=#d6d6d6
| 293363 ||  || — || March 9, 2007 || Palomar || NEAT || — || align=right | 4.2 km || 
|-id=364 bgcolor=#d6d6d6
| 293364 ||  || — || March 9, 2007 || Mount Lemmon || Mount Lemmon Survey || KAR || align=right | 1.2 km || 
|-id=365 bgcolor=#E9E9E9
| 293365 ||  || — || March 9, 2007 || Mount Lemmon || Mount Lemmon Survey || — || align=right | 2.8 km || 
|-id=366 bgcolor=#d6d6d6
| 293366 Roux ||  ||  || March 9, 2007 || Saint-Sulpice || B. Christophe || CHA || align=right | 2.5 km || 
|-id=367 bgcolor=#E9E9E9
| 293367 ||  || — || March 9, 2007 || Kitt Peak || Spacewatch || HOF || align=right | 3.1 km || 
|-id=368 bgcolor=#d6d6d6
| 293368 ||  || — || March 9, 2007 || Kitt Peak || Spacewatch || — || align=right | 3.4 km || 
|-id=369 bgcolor=#d6d6d6
| 293369 ||  || — || March 9, 2007 || Mount Lemmon || Mount Lemmon Survey || — || align=right | 3.3 km || 
|-id=370 bgcolor=#C2FFFF
| 293370 ||  || — || March 9, 2007 || Mount Lemmon || Mount Lemmon Survey || L5 || align=right | 12 km || 
|-id=371 bgcolor=#d6d6d6
| 293371 ||  || — || March 9, 2007 || Mount Lemmon || Mount Lemmon Survey || VER || align=right | 2.9 km || 
|-id=372 bgcolor=#fefefe
| 293372 ||  || — || March 9, 2007 || Lulin || C.-S. Lin, Q.-z. Ye || — || align=right | 1.9 km || 
|-id=373 bgcolor=#E9E9E9
| 293373 ||  || — || March 10, 2007 || Mount Lemmon || Mount Lemmon Survey || NEM || align=right | 2.5 km || 
|-id=374 bgcolor=#E9E9E9
| 293374 ||  || — || March 10, 2007 || Kitt Peak || Spacewatch || — || align=right | 1.6 km || 
|-id=375 bgcolor=#fefefe
| 293375 ||  || — || March 10, 2007 || Kitt Peak || Spacewatch || NYS || align=right data-sort-value="0.86" | 860 m || 
|-id=376 bgcolor=#d6d6d6
| 293376 ||  || — || March 10, 2007 || Kitt Peak || Spacewatch || THM || align=right | 2.3 km || 
|-id=377 bgcolor=#fefefe
| 293377 ||  || — || March 10, 2007 || Mount Lemmon || Mount Lemmon Survey || FLO || align=right data-sort-value="0.87" | 870 m || 
|-id=378 bgcolor=#E9E9E9
| 293378 ||  || — || March 9, 2007 || Palomar || NEAT || — || align=right data-sort-value="0.91" | 910 m || 
|-id=379 bgcolor=#d6d6d6
| 293379 ||  || — || March 9, 2007 || Kitt Peak || Spacewatch || — || align=right | 2.8 km || 
|-id=380 bgcolor=#E9E9E9
| 293380 ||  || — || March 10, 2007 || Mount Lemmon || Mount Lemmon Survey || — || align=right data-sort-value="0.83" | 830 m || 
|-id=381 bgcolor=#E9E9E9
| 293381 ||  || — || March 11, 2007 || Anderson Mesa || LONEOS || — || align=right | 3.8 km || 
|-id=382 bgcolor=#fefefe
| 293382 ||  || — || March 11, 2007 || Anderson Mesa || LONEOS || — || align=right | 1.4 km || 
|-id=383 bgcolor=#d6d6d6
| 293383 Maigret ||  ||  || March 11, 2007 || Saint-Sulpice || B. Christophe || — || align=right | 3.3 km || 
|-id=384 bgcolor=#fefefe
| 293384 ||  || — || March 9, 2007 || Kitt Peak || Spacewatch || — || align=right data-sort-value="0.99" | 990 m || 
|-id=385 bgcolor=#d6d6d6
| 293385 ||  || — || March 9, 2007 || Kitt Peak || Spacewatch || — || align=right | 3.8 km || 
|-id=386 bgcolor=#C2FFFF
| 293386 ||  || — || March 9, 2007 || Kitt Peak || Spacewatch || L5 || align=right | 13 km || 
|-id=387 bgcolor=#d6d6d6
| 293387 ||  || — || March 9, 2007 || Kitt Peak || Spacewatch || MRC || align=right | 3.0 km || 
|-id=388 bgcolor=#d6d6d6
| 293388 ||  || — || March 9, 2007 || Mount Lemmon || Mount Lemmon Survey || THM || align=right | 2.8 km || 
|-id=389 bgcolor=#E9E9E9
| 293389 ||  || — || March 9, 2007 || Kitt Peak || Spacewatch || WIT || align=right | 1.3 km || 
|-id=390 bgcolor=#fefefe
| 293390 ||  || — || March 9, 2007 || Kitt Peak || Spacewatch || MAS || align=right data-sort-value="0.96" | 960 m || 
|-id=391 bgcolor=#E9E9E9
| 293391 ||  || — || March 9, 2007 || Kitt Peak || Spacewatch || — || align=right | 1.5 km || 
|-id=392 bgcolor=#d6d6d6
| 293392 ||  || — || March 11, 2007 || Kitt Peak || Spacewatch || — || align=right | 3.4 km || 
|-id=393 bgcolor=#E9E9E9
| 293393 ||  || — || March 11, 2007 || Mount Lemmon || Mount Lemmon Survey || — || align=right | 3.3 km || 
|-id=394 bgcolor=#fefefe
| 293394 ||  || — || March 9, 2007 || Mount Lemmon || Mount Lemmon Survey || — || align=right data-sort-value="0.60" | 600 m || 
|-id=395 bgcolor=#E9E9E9
| 293395 ||  || — || March 10, 2007 || Kitt Peak || Spacewatch || — || align=right | 1.5 km || 
|-id=396 bgcolor=#fefefe
| 293396 ||  || — || March 10, 2007 || Kitt Peak || Spacewatch || — || align=right | 1.0 km || 
|-id=397 bgcolor=#d6d6d6
| 293397 ||  || — || March 10, 2007 || Kitt Peak || Spacewatch || — || align=right | 2.5 km || 
|-id=398 bgcolor=#d6d6d6
| 293398 ||  || — || March 10, 2007 || Kitt Peak || Spacewatch || THM || align=right | 2.8 km || 
|-id=399 bgcolor=#E9E9E9
| 293399 ||  || — || March 10, 2007 || Kitt Peak || Spacewatch || — || align=right | 2.4 km || 
|-id=400 bgcolor=#d6d6d6
| 293400 ||  || — || March 10, 2007 || Kitt Peak || Spacewatch || — || align=right | 4.7 km || 
|}

293401–293500 

|-bgcolor=#d6d6d6
| 293401 ||  || — || March 10, 2007 || Kitt Peak || Spacewatch || CHA || align=right | 1.9 km || 
|-id=402 bgcolor=#E9E9E9
| 293402 ||  || — || March 10, 2007 || Kitt Peak || Spacewatch || — || align=right | 1.5 km || 
|-id=403 bgcolor=#d6d6d6
| 293403 ||  || — || March 10, 2007 || Kitt Peak || Spacewatch || NAE || align=right | 3.1 km || 
|-id=404 bgcolor=#fefefe
| 293404 ||  || — || March 10, 2007 || Kitt Peak || Spacewatch || NYS || align=right data-sort-value="0.84" | 840 m || 
|-id=405 bgcolor=#d6d6d6
| 293405 ||  || — || March 10, 2007 || Kitt Peak || Spacewatch || HYG || align=right | 2.9 km || 
|-id=406 bgcolor=#d6d6d6
| 293406 ||  || — || March 11, 2007 || Anderson Mesa || LONEOS || — || align=right | 4.9 km || 
|-id=407 bgcolor=#E9E9E9
| 293407 ||  || — || March 12, 2007 || Kitt Peak || Spacewatch || — || align=right data-sort-value="0.95" | 950 m || 
|-id=408 bgcolor=#d6d6d6
| 293408 ||  || — || March 12, 2007 || Catalina || CSS || — || align=right | 4.9 km || 
|-id=409 bgcolor=#d6d6d6
| 293409 ||  || — || March 12, 2007 || Kitt Peak || Spacewatch || TIR || align=right | 4.5 km || 
|-id=410 bgcolor=#E9E9E9
| 293410 ||  || — || March 13, 2007 || Catalina || CSS || — || align=right | 3.4 km || 
|-id=411 bgcolor=#fefefe
| 293411 ||  || — || March 13, 2007 || Catalina || CSS || H || align=right data-sort-value="0.59" | 590 m || 
|-id=412 bgcolor=#E9E9E9
| 293412 ||  || — || March 9, 2007 || Palomar || NEAT || — || align=right | 3.0 km || 
|-id=413 bgcolor=#d6d6d6
| 293413 ||  || — || March 10, 2007 || Mount Lemmon || Mount Lemmon Survey || — || align=right | 2.7 km || 
|-id=414 bgcolor=#E9E9E9
| 293414 ||  || — || March 11, 2007 || Kitt Peak || Spacewatch || — || align=right | 1.6 km || 
|-id=415 bgcolor=#d6d6d6
| 293415 ||  || — || March 11, 2007 || Kitt Peak || Spacewatch || — || align=right | 2.4 km || 
|-id=416 bgcolor=#E9E9E9
| 293416 ||  || — || March 11, 2007 || Kitt Peak || Spacewatch || XIZ || align=right | 1.4 km || 
|-id=417 bgcolor=#E9E9E9
| 293417 ||  || — || March 11, 2007 || Kitt Peak || Spacewatch || — || align=right | 1.9 km || 
|-id=418 bgcolor=#C2FFFF
| 293418 ||  || — || March 11, 2007 || Mount Lemmon || Mount Lemmon Survey || L5 || align=right | 12 km || 
|-id=419 bgcolor=#E9E9E9
| 293419 ||  || — || March 11, 2007 || Kitt Peak || Spacewatch || MRX || align=right | 1.1 km || 
|-id=420 bgcolor=#E9E9E9
| 293420 ||  || — || March 11, 2007 || Kitt Peak || Spacewatch || — || align=right | 1.9 km || 
|-id=421 bgcolor=#d6d6d6
| 293421 ||  || — || March 11, 2007 || Kitt Peak || Spacewatch || — || align=right | 3.9 km || 
|-id=422 bgcolor=#fefefe
| 293422 ||  || — || March 11, 2007 || Mount Lemmon || Mount Lemmon Survey || — || align=right data-sort-value="0.72" | 720 m || 
|-id=423 bgcolor=#fefefe
| 293423 ||  || — || March 11, 2007 || Kitt Peak || Spacewatch || FLO || align=right data-sort-value="0.84" | 840 m || 
|-id=424 bgcolor=#d6d6d6
| 293424 ||  || — || March 13, 2007 || Mount Lemmon || Mount Lemmon Survey || — || align=right | 3.9 km || 
|-id=425 bgcolor=#E9E9E9
| 293425 ||  || — || March 14, 2007 || Mount Lemmon || Mount Lemmon Survey || — || align=right | 3.1 km || 
|-id=426 bgcolor=#d6d6d6
| 293426 ||  || — || March 9, 2007 || Mount Lemmon || Mount Lemmon Survey || — || align=right | 2.6 km || 
|-id=427 bgcolor=#d6d6d6
| 293427 ||  || — || March 9, 2007 || Mount Lemmon || Mount Lemmon Survey || — || align=right | 4.7 km || 
|-id=428 bgcolor=#d6d6d6
| 293428 ||  || — || March 10, 2007 || Mount Lemmon || Mount Lemmon Survey || — || align=right | 4.5 km || 
|-id=429 bgcolor=#fefefe
| 293429 ||  || — || March 11, 2007 || Kitt Peak || Spacewatch || — || align=right data-sort-value="0.95" | 950 m || 
|-id=430 bgcolor=#d6d6d6
| 293430 ||  || — || March 12, 2007 || Kitt Peak || Spacewatch || — || align=right | 2.8 km || 
|-id=431 bgcolor=#fefefe
| 293431 ||  || — || March 12, 2007 || Kitt Peak || Spacewatch || FLO || align=right data-sort-value="0.65" | 650 m || 
|-id=432 bgcolor=#d6d6d6
| 293432 ||  || — || March 12, 2007 || Mount Lemmon || Mount Lemmon Survey || K-2 || align=right | 1.5 km || 
|-id=433 bgcolor=#E9E9E9
| 293433 ||  || — || March 12, 2007 || Mount Lemmon || Mount Lemmon Survey || — || align=right | 1.8 km || 
|-id=434 bgcolor=#d6d6d6
| 293434 ||  || — || March 12, 2007 || Mount Lemmon || Mount Lemmon Survey || EOS || align=right | 2.5 km || 
|-id=435 bgcolor=#E9E9E9
| 293435 ||  || — || March 12, 2007 || Mount Lemmon || Mount Lemmon Survey || — || align=right | 1.7 km || 
|-id=436 bgcolor=#d6d6d6
| 293436 ||  || — || March 12, 2007 || Mount Lemmon || Mount Lemmon Survey || — || align=right | 2.8 km || 
|-id=437 bgcolor=#E9E9E9
| 293437 ||  || — || March 12, 2007 || Kitt Peak || Spacewatch || — || align=right | 3.4 km || 
|-id=438 bgcolor=#d6d6d6
| 293438 ||  || — || March 12, 2007 || Kitt Peak || Spacewatch || — || align=right | 4.4 km || 
|-id=439 bgcolor=#E9E9E9
| 293439 ||  || — || March 13, 2007 || Mount Lemmon || Mount Lemmon Survey || — || align=right | 2.7 km || 
|-id=440 bgcolor=#d6d6d6
| 293440 ||  || — || March 14, 2007 || Mount Lemmon || Mount Lemmon Survey || — || align=right | 4.7 km || 
|-id=441 bgcolor=#fefefe
| 293441 ||  || — || March 14, 2007 || Kitt Peak || Spacewatch || H || align=right data-sort-value="0.86" | 860 m || 
|-id=442 bgcolor=#fefefe
| 293442 ||  || — || March 15, 2007 || Kitt Peak || Spacewatch || FLO || align=right data-sort-value="0.64" | 640 m || 
|-id=443 bgcolor=#d6d6d6
| 293443 ||  || — || March 11, 2007 || Mount Lemmon || Mount Lemmon Survey || EOS || align=right | 2.3 km || 
|-id=444 bgcolor=#d6d6d6
| 293444 ||  || — || March 13, 2007 || Mount Lemmon || Mount Lemmon Survey || — || align=right | 3.6 km || 
|-id=445 bgcolor=#E9E9E9
| 293445 ||  || — || March 13, 2007 || Kitt Peak || Spacewatch || — || align=right | 1.5 km || 
|-id=446 bgcolor=#d6d6d6
| 293446 ||  || — || March 13, 2007 || Kitt Peak || Spacewatch || — || align=right | 4.1 km || 
|-id=447 bgcolor=#d6d6d6
| 293447 ||  || — || March 13, 2007 || Kitt Peak || Spacewatch || THM || align=right | 2.6 km || 
|-id=448 bgcolor=#d6d6d6
| 293448 ||  || — || March 14, 2007 || Kitt Peak || Spacewatch || EOS || align=right | 3.0 km || 
|-id=449 bgcolor=#fefefe
| 293449 ||  || — || March 14, 2007 || Kitt Peak || Spacewatch || — || align=right | 2.1 km || 
|-id=450 bgcolor=#fefefe
| 293450 ||  || — || March 14, 2007 || Kitt Peak || Spacewatch || — || align=right | 1.0 km || 
|-id=451 bgcolor=#fefefe
| 293451 ||  || — || March 14, 2007 || Kitt Peak || Spacewatch || — || align=right | 1.3 km || 
|-id=452 bgcolor=#fefefe
| 293452 ||  || — || March 14, 2007 || Mount Lemmon || Mount Lemmon Survey || V || align=right data-sort-value="0.79" | 790 m || 
|-id=453 bgcolor=#E9E9E9
| 293453 ||  || — || March 12, 2007 || Mount Lemmon || Mount Lemmon Survey || — || align=right | 1.3 km || 
|-id=454 bgcolor=#fefefe
| 293454 ||  || — || March 13, 2007 || Catalina || CSS || H || align=right | 1.1 km || 
|-id=455 bgcolor=#d6d6d6
| 293455 ||  || — || March 13, 2007 || Kitt Peak || Spacewatch || — || align=right | 4.9 km || 
|-id=456 bgcolor=#C2FFFF
| 293456 ||  || — || March 13, 2007 || Kitt Peak || Spacewatch || L5 || align=right | 10 km || 
|-id=457 bgcolor=#E9E9E9
| 293457 ||  || — || March 15, 2007 || Kitt Peak || Spacewatch || MIS || align=right | 2.3 km || 
|-id=458 bgcolor=#E9E9E9
| 293458 ||  || — || March 15, 2007 || Catalina || CSS || EUN || align=right | 1.6 km || 
|-id=459 bgcolor=#E9E9E9
| 293459 ||  || — || March 15, 2007 || Kitt Peak || Spacewatch || — || align=right | 3.6 km || 
|-id=460 bgcolor=#fefefe
| 293460 ||  || — || March 15, 2007 || Kitt Peak || Spacewatch || NYS || align=right data-sort-value="0.66" | 660 m || 
|-id=461 bgcolor=#fefefe
| 293461 ||  || — || March 10, 2007 || Kitt Peak || Spacewatch || — || align=right data-sort-value="0.67" | 670 m || 
|-id=462 bgcolor=#E9E9E9
| 293462 ||  || — || March 10, 2007 || Mount Lemmon || Mount Lemmon Survey || — || align=right | 2.3 km || 
|-id=463 bgcolor=#d6d6d6
| 293463 ||  || — || March 11, 2007 || Kitt Peak || Spacewatch || — || align=right | 3.3 km || 
|-id=464 bgcolor=#d6d6d6
| 293464 ||  || — || March 11, 2007 || Kitt Peak || Spacewatch || THM || align=right | 4.6 km || 
|-id=465 bgcolor=#d6d6d6
| 293465 ||  || — || March 14, 2007 || Kitt Peak || Spacewatch || EOS || align=right | 3.0 km || 
|-id=466 bgcolor=#d6d6d6
| 293466 ||  || — || March 15, 2007 || Mount Lemmon || Mount Lemmon Survey || — || align=right | 5.0 km || 
|-id=467 bgcolor=#d6d6d6
| 293467 ||  || — || March 8, 2007 || Palomar || NEAT || — || align=right | 4.1 km || 
|-id=468 bgcolor=#E9E9E9
| 293468 ||  || — || March 14, 2007 || Siding Spring || SSS || — || align=right | 1.6 km || 
|-id=469 bgcolor=#d6d6d6
| 293469 ||  || — || March 9, 2007 || Kitt Peak || Spacewatch || — || align=right | 4.2 km || 
|-id=470 bgcolor=#d6d6d6
| 293470 ||  || — || March 11, 2007 || Catalina || CSS || — || align=right | 3.1 km || 
|-id=471 bgcolor=#E9E9E9
| 293471 ||  || — || March 9, 2007 || Mount Lemmon || Mount Lemmon Survey || — || align=right | 1.6 km || 
|-id=472 bgcolor=#fefefe
| 293472 ||  || — || March 9, 2007 || Kitt Peak || Spacewatch || FLO || align=right data-sort-value="0.88" | 880 m || 
|-id=473 bgcolor=#d6d6d6
| 293473 ||  || — || March 13, 2007 || Kitt Peak || Spacewatch || — || align=right | 3.9 km || 
|-id=474 bgcolor=#d6d6d6
| 293474 ||  || — || March 15, 2007 || Mount Lemmon || Mount Lemmon Survey || — || align=right | 3.5 km || 
|-id=475 bgcolor=#d6d6d6
| 293475 ||  || — || March 11, 2007 || Mount Lemmon || Mount Lemmon Survey || SYL7:4 || align=right | 4.2 km || 
|-id=476 bgcolor=#fefefe
| 293476 ||  || — || March 13, 2007 || Mount Lemmon || Mount Lemmon Survey || FLO || align=right data-sort-value="0.68" | 680 m || 
|-id=477 bgcolor=#d6d6d6
| 293477 Teotihuacan ||  ||  || March 16, 2007 || Vallemare Borbon || V. S. Casulli || — || align=right | 2.7 km || 
|-id=478 bgcolor=#d6d6d6
| 293478 ||  || — || March 16, 2007 || Catalina || CSS || — || align=right | 5.4 km || 
|-id=479 bgcolor=#fefefe
| 293479 ||  || — || March 16, 2007 || Kitt Peak || Spacewatch || FLO || align=right data-sort-value="0.79" | 790 m || 
|-id=480 bgcolor=#E9E9E9
| 293480 ||  || — || March 18, 2007 || Kitt Peak || Spacewatch || — || align=right | 3.6 km || 
|-id=481 bgcolor=#fefefe
| 293481 ||  || — || March 20, 2007 || Socorro || LINEAR || — || align=right data-sort-value="0.97" | 970 m || 
|-id=482 bgcolor=#d6d6d6
| 293482 ||  || — || March 20, 2007 || Anderson Mesa || LONEOS || — || align=right | 4.6 km || 
|-id=483 bgcolor=#d6d6d6
| 293483 ||  || — || March 20, 2007 || Kitt Peak || Spacewatch || — || align=right | 3.5 km || 
|-id=484 bgcolor=#d6d6d6
| 293484 ||  || — || March 20, 2007 || Mount Lemmon || Mount Lemmon Survey || KOR || align=right | 1.9 km || 
|-id=485 bgcolor=#E9E9E9
| 293485 ||  || — || March 20, 2007 || Mount Lemmon || Mount Lemmon Survey || HOF || align=right | 3.5 km || 
|-id=486 bgcolor=#C2FFFF
| 293486 ||  || — || March 20, 2007 || Mount Lemmon || Mount Lemmon Survey || L5ENM || align=right | 17 km || 
|-id=487 bgcolor=#d6d6d6
| 293487 ||  || — || March 20, 2007 || Mount Lemmon || Mount Lemmon Survey || EOS || align=right | 2.8 km || 
|-id=488 bgcolor=#d6d6d6
| 293488 ||  || — || March 20, 2007 || Mount Lemmon || Mount Lemmon Survey || — || align=right | 5.0 km || 
|-id=489 bgcolor=#d6d6d6
| 293489 ||  || — || March 20, 2007 || Kitt Peak || Spacewatch || — || align=right | 3.6 km || 
|-id=490 bgcolor=#fefefe
| 293490 ||  || — || March 25, 2007 || Mount Lemmon || Mount Lemmon Survey || — || align=right data-sort-value="0.64" | 640 m || 
|-id=491 bgcolor=#fefefe
| 293491 ||  || — || March 26, 2007 || Mount Lemmon || Mount Lemmon Survey || — || align=right data-sort-value="0.78" | 780 m || 
|-id=492 bgcolor=#E9E9E9
| 293492 ||  || — || March 20, 2007 || Kitt Peak || Spacewatch || — || align=right | 1.3 km || 
|-id=493 bgcolor=#d6d6d6
| 293493 ||  || — || March 20, 2007 || Kitt Peak || Spacewatch || CHA || align=right | 2.1 km || 
|-id=494 bgcolor=#d6d6d6
| 293494 ||  || — || March 26, 2007 || Mount Lemmon || Mount Lemmon Survey || KAR || align=right | 1.3 km || 
|-id=495 bgcolor=#fefefe
| 293495 ||  || — || March 16, 2007 || Mount Lemmon || Mount Lemmon Survey || — || align=right | 1.0 km || 
|-id=496 bgcolor=#d6d6d6
| 293496 ||  || — || March 26, 2007 || Kitt Peak || Spacewatch || — || align=right | 3.3 km || 
|-id=497 bgcolor=#E9E9E9
| 293497 ||  || — || April 7, 2007 || Mount Lemmon || Mount Lemmon Survey || GEF || align=right | 1.8 km || 
|-id=498 bgcolor=#E9E9E9
| 293498 ||  || — || April 9, 2007 || Siding Spring || SSS || ADE || align=right | 3.6 km || 
|-id=499 bgcolor=#d6d6d6
| 293499 Wolinski ||  ||  || April 14, 2007 || Nogales || J.-C. Merlin || CRO || align=right | 3.6 km || 
|-id=500 bgcolor=#E9E9E9
| 293500 ||  || — || April 7, 2007 || Catalina || CSS || — || align=right | 2.2 km || 
|}

293501–293600 

|-bgcolor=#fefefe
| 293501 ||  || — || April 8, 2007 || Kitt Peak || Spacewatch || — || align=right data-sort-value="0.94" | 940 m || 
|-id=502 bgcolor=#C2FFFF
| 293502 ||  || — || April 11, 2007 || Kitt Peak || Spacewatch || L5 || align=right | 8.5 km || 
|-id=503 bgcolor=#E9E9E9
| 293503 ||  || — || April 11, 2007 || Kitt Peak || Spacewatch || AGN || align=right | 1.6 km || 
|-id=504 bgcolor=#E9E9E9
| 293504 ||  || — || April 11, 2007 || Kitt Peak || Spacewatch || — || align=right | 2.3 km || 
|-id=505 bgcolor=#d6d6d6
| 293505 ||  || — || April 11, 2007 || Kitt Peak || Spacewatch || HYG || align=right | 3.3 km || 
|-id=506 bgcolor=#d6d6d6
| 293506 ||  || — || April 11, 2007 || Mount Lemmon || Mount Lemmon Survey || — || align=right | 2.9 km || 
|-id=507 bgcolor=#fefefe
| 293507 ||  || — || April 11, 2007 || Kitt Peak || Spacewatch || — || align=right data-sort-value="0.69" | 690 m || 
|-id=508 bgcolor=#d6d6d6
| 293508 ||  || — || April 11, 2007 || Kitt Peak || Spacewatch || KOR || align=right | 1.5 km || 
|-id=509 bgcolor=#fefefe
| 293509 ||  || — || April 11, 2007 || Kitt Peak || Spacewatch || V || align=right data-sort-value="0.74" | 740 m || 
|-id=510 bgcolor=#d6d6d6
| 293510 ||  || — || April 11, 2007 || Mount Lemmon || Mount Lemmon Survey || — || align=right | 3.0 km || 
|-id=511 bgcolor=#d6d6d6
| 293511 ||  || — || April 11, 2007 || Siding Spring || SSS || — || align=right | 4.3 km || 
|-id=512 bgcolor=#d6d6d6
| 293512 ||  || — || April 13, 2007 || Siding Spring || SSS || — || align=right | 7.0 km || 
|-id=513 bgcolor=#fefefe
| 293513 ||  || — || April 14, 2007 || Mount Lemmon || Mount Lemmon Survey || — || align=right data-sort-value="0.99" | 990 m || 
|-id=514 bgcolor=#d6d6d6
| 293514 ||  || — || April 14, 2007 || Mount Lemmon || Mount Lemmon Survey || HYG || align=right | 4.0 km || 
|-id=515 bgcolor=#E9E9E9
| 293515 ||  || — || April 11, 2007 || Catalina || CSS || — || align=right | 3.8 km || 
|-id=516 bgcolor=#C2FFFF
| 293516 ||  || — || April 14, 2007 || Kitt Peak || Spacewatch || L5 || align=right | 9.7 km || 
|-id=517 bgcolor=#d6d6d6
| 293517 ||  || — || April 14, 2007 || Kitt Peak || Spacewatch || — || align=right | 2.2 km || 
|-id=518 bgcolor=#fefefe
| 293518 ||  || — || April 14, 2007 || Kitt Peak || Spacewatch || FLO || align=right data-sort-value="0.58" | 580 m || 
|-id=519 bgcolor=#E9E9E9
| 293519 ||  || — || April 14, 2007 || Kitt Peak || Spacewatch || — || align=right | 2.7 km || 
|-id=520 bgcolor=#d6d6d6
| 293520 ||  || — || April 14, 2007 || Kitt Peak || Spacewatch || — || align=right | 3.7 km || 
|-id=521 bgcolor=#fefefe
| 293521 ||  || — || April 14, 2007 || Mount Lemmon || Mount Lemmon Survey || NYS || align=right data-sort-value="0.95" | 950 m || 
|-id=522 bgcolor=#fefefe
| 293522 ||  || — || April 14, 2007 || Kitt Peak || Spacewatch || V || align=right data-sort-value="0.71" | 710 m || 
|-id=523 bgcolor=#d6d6d6
| 293523 ||  || — || April 14, 2007 || Kitt Peak || Spacewatch || — || align=right | 3.5 km || 
|-id=524 bgcolor=#d6d6d6
| 293524 ||  || — || April 14, 2007 || Kitt Peak || Spacewatch || — || align=right | 4.0 km || 
|-id=525 bgcolor=#d6d6d6
| 293525 ||  || — || April 14, 2007 || Mount Lemmon || Mount Lemmon Survey || — || align=right | 3.4 km || 
|-id=526 bgcolor=#fefefe
| 293526 ||  || — || April 15, 2007 || Kitt Peak || Spacewatch || — || align=right data-sort-value="0.98" | 980 m || 
|-id=527 bgcolor=#fefefe
| 293527 ||  || — || April 15, 2007 || Kitt Peak || Spacewatch || — || align=right | 1.1 km || 
|-id=528 bgcolor=#d6d6d6
| 293528 ||  || — || April 15, 2007 || Kitt Peak || Spacewatch || — || align=right | 3.2 km || 
|-id=529 bgcolor=#d6d6d6
| 293529 ||  || — || April 15, 2007 || Kitt Peak || Spacewatch || — || align=right | 2.9 km || 
|-id=530 bgcolor=#fefefe
| 293530 ||  || — || April 15, 2007 || Catalina || CSS || FLO || align=right data-sort-value="0.62" | 620 m || 
|-id=531 bgcolor=#fefefe
| 293531 ||  || — || April 15, 2007 || Catalina || CSS || — || align=right | 1.2 km || 
|-id=532 bgcolor=#fefefe
| 293532 ||  || — || April 15, 2007 || Kitt Peak || Spacewatch || — || align=right data-sort-value="0.69" | 690 m || 
|-id=533 bgcolor=#d6d6d6
| 293533 ||  || — || April 15, 2007 || Catalina || CSS || — || align=right | 5.3 km || 
|-id=534 bgcolor=#d6d6d6
| 293534 ||  || — || April 14, 2007 || Kitt Peak || Spacewatch || 7:4 || align=right | 3.6 km || 
|-id=535 bgcolor=#d6d6d6
| 293535 ||  || — || April 14, 2007 || Kitt Peak || Spacewatch || — || align=right | 3.1 km || 
|-id=536 bgcolor=#d6d6d6
| 293536 || 2007 HL || — || April 16, 2007 || Altschwendt || W. Ries || — || align=right | 4.2 km || 
|-id=537 bgcolor=#d6d6d6
| 293537 ||  || — || April 16, 2007 || Catalina || CSS || — || align=right | 4.6 km || 
|-id=538 bgcolor=#d6d6d6
| 293538 ||  || — || April 17, 2007 || Catalina || CSS || EUP || align=right | 4.8 km || 
|-id=539 bgcolor=#fefefe
| 293539 ||  || — || April 16, 2007 || Mount Lemmon || Mount Lemmon Survey || — || align=right data-sort-value="0.86" | 860 m || 
|-id=540 bgcolor=#d6d6d6
| 293540 ||  || — || April 16, 2007 || Mount Lemmon || Mount Lemmon Survey || — || align=right | 3.1 km || 
|-id=541 bgcolor=#fefefe
| 293541 ||  || — || April 16, 2007 || Purple Mountain || PMO NEO || — || align=right | 1.2 km || 
|-id=542 bgcolor=#E9E9E9
| 293542 ||  || — || April 18, 2007 || Mount Lemmon || Mount Lemmon Survey || — || align=right | 1.4 km || 
|-id=543 bgcolor=#fefefe
| 293543 ||  || — || April 16, 2007 || Catalina || CSS || NYS || align=right data-sort-value="0.74" | 740 m || 
|-id=544 bgcolor=#fefefe
| 293544 ||  || — || April 19, 2007 || Kitt Peak || Spacewatch || — || align=right data-sort-value="0.80" | 800 m || 
|-id=545 bgcolor=#fefefe
| 293545 ||  || — || April 16, 2007 || Mount Lemmon || Mount Lemmon Survey || MAS || align=right data-sort-value="0.88" | 880 m || 
|-id=546 bgcolor=#fefefe
| 293546 ||  || — || April 18, 2007 || Kitt Peak || Spacewatch || — || align=right data-sort-value="0.75" | 750 m || 
|-id=547 bgcolor=#d6d6d6
| 293547 ||  || — || April 18, 2007 || Kitt Peak || Spacewatch || — || align=right | 3.5 km || 
|-id=548 bgcolor=#d6d6d6
| 293548 ||  || — || April 18, 2007 || Kitt Peak || Spacewatch || — || align=right | 3.1 km || 
|-id=549 bgcolor=#E9E9E9
| 293549 ||  || — || April 18, 2007 || Kitt Peak || Spacewatch || — || align=right | 2.5 km || 
|-id=550 bgcolor=#fefefe
| 293550 ||  || — || April 18, 2007 || Mount Lemmon || Mount Lemmon Survey || NYS || align=right data-sort-value="0.83" | 830 m || 
|-id=551 bgcolor=#fefefe
| 293551 ||  || — || April 18, 2007 || Mount Lemmon || Mount Lemmon Survey || — || align=right data-sort-value="0.79" | 790 m || 
|-id=552 bgcolor=#d6d6d6
| 293552 ||  || — || April 19, 2007 || Mount Lemmon || Mount Lemmon Survey || EOS || align=right | 2.8 km || 
|-id=553 bgcolor=#FA8072
| 293553 ||  || — || April 19, 2007 || Kitt Peak || Spacewatch || — || align=right data-sort-value="0.72" | 720 m || 
|-id=554 bgcolor=#fefefe
| 293554 ||  || — || April 19, 2007 || Kitt Peak || Spacewatch || — || align=right data-sort-value="0.73" | 730 m || 
|-id=555 bgcolor=#fefefe
| 293555 ||  || — || April 20, 2007 || Kitt Peak || Spacewatch || — || align=right | 1.2 km || 
|-id=556 bgcolor=#d6d6d6
| 293556 ||  || — || April 20, 2007 || Kitt Peak || Spacewatch || HYG || align=right | 4.4 km || 
|-id=557 bgcolor=#C2FFFF
| 293557 ||  || — || April 20, 2007 || Mount Lemmon || Mount Lemmon Survey || L5 || align=right | 11 km || 
|-id=558 bgcolor=#d6d6d6
| 293558 ||  || — || April 18, 2007 || Catalina || CSS || THB || align=right | 4.1 km || 
|-id=559 bgcolor=#E9E9E9
| 293559 ||  || — || April 19, 2007 || Lulin Observatory || LUSS || NEM || align=right | 3.3 km || 
|-id=560 bgcolor=#d6d6d6
| 293560 ||  || — || April 20, 2007 || Kitt Peak || Spacewatch || — || align=right | 4.5 km || 
|-id=561 bgcolor=#fefefe
| 293561 ||  || — || April 20, 2007 || Kitt Peak || Spacewatch || — || align=right data-sort-value="0.86" | 860 m || 
|-id=562 bgcolor=#d6d6d6
| 293562 ||  || — || April 20, 2007 || Kitt Peak || Spacewatch || — || align=right | 2.7 km || 
|-id=563 bgcolor=#d6d6d6
| 293563 ||  || — || April 20, 2007 || Kitt Peak || Spacewatch || — || align=right | 4.1 km || 
|-id=564 bgcolor=#fefefe
| 293564 ||  || — || April 20, 2007 || Kitt Peak || Spacewatch || — || align=right data-sort-value="0.83" | 830 m || 
|-id=565 bgcolor=#d6d6d6
| 293565 ||  || — || April 22, 2007 || Kitt Peak || Spacewatch || — || align=right | 4.7 km || 
|-id=566 bgcolor=#fefefe
| 293566 ||  || — || April 22, 2007 || Mount Lemmon || Mount Lemmon Survey || FLO || align=right | 1.9 km || 
|-id=567 bgcolor=#E9E9E9
| 293567 ||  || — || April 23, 2007 || Catalina || CSS || — || align=right | 3.0 km || 
|-id=568 bgcolor=#d6d6d6
| 293568 ||  || — || April 22, 2007 || Mount Lemmon || Mount Lemmon Survey || — || align=right | 3.2 km || 
|-id=569 bgcolor=#fefefe
| 293569 ||  || — || April 22, 2007 || Kitt Peak || Spacewatch || MAS || align=right data-sort-value="0.82" | 820 m || 
|-id=570 bgcolor=#d6d6d6
| 293570 ||  || — || April 22, 2007 || Kitt Peak || Spacewatch || — || align=right | 2.2 km || 
|-id=571 bgcolor=#d6d6d6
| 293571 ||  || — || April 22, 2007 || Kitt Peak || Spacewatch || HYG || align=right | 3.2 km || 
|-id=572 bgcolor=#d6d6d6
| 293572 ||  || — || April 22, 2007 || Kitt Peak || Spacewatch || EOS || align=right | 4.2 km || 
|-id=573 bgcolor=#d6d6d6
| 293573 ||  || — || April 24, 2007 || Kitt Peak || Spacewatch || — || align=right | 3.7 km || 
|-id=574 bgcolor=#d6d6d6
| 293574 ||  || — || April 25, 2007 || Mount Lemmon || Mount Lemmon Survey || — || align=right | 3.2 km || 
|-id=575 bgcolor=#fefefe
| 293575 ||  || — || April 25, 2007 || Kitt Peak || Spacewatch || V || align=right data-sort-value="0.76" | 760 m || 
|-id=576 bgcolor=#d6d6d6
| 293576 ||  || — || April 22, 2007 || Kitt Peak || Spacewatch || — || align=right | 4.3 km || 
|-id=577 bgcolor=#fefefe
| 293577 ||  || — || April 24, 2007 || Kitt Peak || Spacewatch || FLO || align=right data-sort-value="0.66" | 660 m || 
|-id=578 bgcolor=#d6d6d6
| 293578 ||  || — || April 23, 2007 || Kitt Peak || Spacewatch || — || align=right | 4.1 km || 
|-id=579 bgcolor=#fefefe
| 293579 ||  || — || April 23, 2007 || Catalina || CSS || — || align=right | 1.1 km || 
|-id=580 bgcolor=#fefefe
| 293580 ||  || — || May 7, 2007 || Kitt Peak || Spacewatch || — || align=right data-sort-value="0.74" | 740 m || 
|-id=581 bgcolor=#fefefe
| 293581 ||  || — || May 7, 2007 || Kitt Peak || Spacewatch || V || align=right data-sort-value="0.88" | 880 m || 
|-id=582 bgcolor=#fefefe
| 293582 ||  || — || May 7, 2007 || Mount Lemmon || Mount Lemmon Survey || — || align=right | 1.8 km || 
|-id=583 bgcolor=#d6d6d6
| 293583 ||  || — || May 7, 2007 || Purple Mountain || PMO NEO || — || align=right | 3.6 km || 
|-id=584 bgcolor=#d6d6d6
| 293584 ||  || — || May 9, 2007 || Eskridge || G. Hug || — || align=right | 4.2 km || 
|-id=585 bgcolor=#fefefe
| 293585 ||  || — || May 6, 2007 || Kitt Peak || Spacewatch || — || align=right data-sort-value="0.90" | 900 m || 
|-id=586 bgcolor=#fefefe
| 293586 ||  || — || May 9, 2007 || Mount Lemmon || Mount Lemmon Survey || FLO || align=right data-sort-value="0.75" | 750 m || 
|-id=587 bgcolor=#d6d6d6
| 293587 ||  || — || May 10, 2007 || Mayhill || A. Lowe || — || align=right | 5.6 km || 
|-id=588 bgcolor=#fefefe
| 293588 ||  || — || May 7, 2007 || Kitt Peak || Spacewatch || NYS || align=right data-sort-value="0.79" | 790 m || 
|-id=589 bgcolor=#fefefe
| 293589 ||  || — || May 11, 2007 || Tiki || S. F. Hönig, N. Teamo || — || align=right data-sort-value="0.94" | 940 m || 
|-id=590 bgcolor=#fefefe
| 293590 ||  || — || May 9, 2007 || Kitt Peak || Spacewatch || — || align=right data-sort-value="0.71" | 710 m || 
|-id=591 bgcolor=#fefefe
| 293591 ||  || — || May 9, 2007 || Kitt Peak || Spacewatch || FLO || align=right data-sort-value="0.64" | 640 m || 
|-id=592 bgcolor=#d6d6d6
| 293592 ||  || — || May 10, 2007 || Mount Lemmon || Mount Lemmon Survey || — || align=right | 3.7 km || 
|-id=593 bgcolor=#fefefe
| 293593 ||  || — || May 11, 2007 || Kitt Peak || Spacewatch || NYS || align=right data-sort-value="0.75" | 750 m || 
|-id=594 bgcolor=#fefefe
| 293594 ||  || — || May 11, 2007 || Mount Lemmon || Mount Lemmon Survey || — || align=right | 2.1 km || 
|-id=595 bgcolor=#fefefe
| 293595 ||  || — || May 11, 2007 || Mount Lemmon || Mount Lemmon Survey || — || align=right | 1.1 km || 
|-id=596 bgcolor=#E9E9E9
| 293596 ||  || — || May 10, 2007 || Mount Lemmon || Mount Lemmon Survey || — || align=right | 2.5 km || 
|-id=597 bgcolor=#fefefe
| 293597 ||  || — || May 9, 2007 || Catalina || CSS || V || align=right data-sort-value="0.81" | 810 m || 
|-id=598 bgcolor=#fefefe
| 293598 ||  || — || May 10, 2007 || Kitt Peak || Spacewatch || — || align=right data-sort-value="0.94" | 940 m || 
|-id=599 bgcolor=#E9E9E9
| 293599 ||  || — || May 13, 2007 || Mount Lemmon || Mount Lemmon Survey || — || align=right | 2.3 km || 
|-id=600 bgcolor=#d6d6d6
| 293600 ||  || — || May 13, 2007 || Kitt Peak || Spacewatch || MEL || align=right | 4.8 km || 
|}

293601–293700 

|-bgcolor=#fefefe
| 293601 ||  || — || May 13, 2007 || Kitt Peak || Spacewatch || — || align=right | 1.3 km || 
|-id=602 bgcolor=#fefefe
| 293602 ||  || — || May 13, 2007 || Črni Vrh || Črni Vrh || — || align=right | 2.6 km || 
|-id=603 bgcolor=#d6d6d6
| 293603 ||  || — || May 9, 2007 || Mount Lemmon || Mount Lemmon Survey || — || align=right | 5.3 km || 
|-id=604 bgcolor=#d6d6d6
| 293604 ||  || — || May 6, 2007 || Purple Mountain || PMO NEO || — || align=right | 4.6 km || 
|-id=605 bgcolor=#fefefe
| 293605 || 2007 KB || — || May 16, 2007 || Wrightwood || J. W. Young || — || align=right data-sort-value="0.80" | 800 m || 
|-id=606 bgcolor=#fefefe
| 293606 ||  || — || May 16, 2007 || Kitt Peak || Spacewatch || FLO || align=right data-sort-value="0.84" | 840 m || 
|-id=607 bgcolor=#d6d6d6
| 293607 ||  || — || May 21, 2007 || Tiki || S. F. Hönig, N. Teamo || — || align=right | 3.8 km || 
|-id=608 bgcolor=#fefefe
| 293608 ||  || — || May 23, 2007 || Reedy Creek || J. Broughton || — || align=right data-sort-value="0.96" | 960 m || 
|-id=609 bgcolor=#d6d6d6
| 293609 ||  || — || May 17, 2007 || Catalina || CSS || — || align=right | 3.7 km || 
|-id=610 bgcolor=#fefefe
| 293610 ||  || — || June 8, 2007 || Kitt Peak || Spacewatch || — || align=right | 2.9 km || 
|-id=611 bgcolor=#fefefe
| 293611 ||  || — || June 8, 2007 || Kitt Peak || Spacewatch || — || align=right data-sort-value="0.81" | 810 m || 
|-id=612 bgcolor=#d6d6d6
| 293612 ||  || — || June 8, 2007 || Kitt Peak || Spacewatch || URS || align=right | 6.1 km || 
|-id=613 bgcolor=#E9E9E9
| 293613 ||  || — || June 9, 2007 || Kitt Peak || Spacewatch || WIT || align=right | 1.2 km || 
|-id=614 bgcolor=#fefefe
| 293614 ||  || — || June 10, 2007 || Kitt Peak || Spacewatch || — || align=right data-sort-value="0.83" | 830 m || 
|-id=615 bgcolor=#fefefe
| 293615 ||  || — || June 10, 2007 || Kitt Peak || Spacewatch || — || align=right data-sort-value="0.74" | 740 m || 
|-id=616 bgcolor=#E9E9E9
| 293616 ||  || — || June 14, 2007 || Kitt Peak || Spacewatch || — || align=right | 1.4 km || 
|-id=617 bgcolor=#d6d6d6
| 293617 ||  || — || June 5, 2007 || Catalina || CSS || EUP || align=right | 3.3 km || 
|-id=618 bgcolor=#d6d6d6
| 293618 ||  || — || June 12, 2007 || Catalina || CSS || — || align=right | 4.8 km || 
|-id=619 bgcolor=#d6d6d6
| 293619 ||  || — || June 12, 2007 || Kitt Peak || Spacewatch || EUP || align=right | 4.3 km || 
|-id=620 bgcolor=#d6d6d6
| 293620 ||  || — || June 15, 2007 || Kitt Peak || Spacewatch || — || align=right | 3.9 km || 
|-id=621 bgcolor=#fefefe
| 293621 ||  || — || June 16, 2007 || Tiki || S. F. Hönig, N. Teamo || FLO || align=right data-sort-value="0.80" | 800 m || 
|-id=622 bgcolor=#fefefe
| 293622 ||  || — || June 16, 2007 || Tiki || S. F. Hönig, N. Teamo || — || align=right | 1.1 km || 
|-id=623 bgcolor=#fefefe
| 293623 ||  || — || June 16, 2007 || Kitt Peak || Spacewatch || FLO || align=right data-sort-value="0.71" | 710 m || 
|-id=624 bgcolor=#fefefe
| 293624 ||  || — || June 16, 2007 || Kitt Peak || Spacewatch || — || align=right data-sort-value="0.98" | 980 m || 
|-id=625 bgcolor=#fefefe
| 293625 ||  || — || June 17, 2007 || Eskridge || G. Hug || — || align=right data-sort-value="0.78" | 780 m || 
|-id=626 bgcolor=#fefefe
| 293626 ||  || — || June 22, 2007 || Anderson Mesa || LONEOS || — || align=right | 1.1 km || 
|-id=627 bgcolor=#fefefe
| 293627 ||  || — || June 21, 2007 || Mount Lemmon || Mount Lemmon Survey || — || align=right data-sort-value="0.94" | 940 m || 
|-id=628 bgcolor=#E9E9E9
| 293628 ||  || — || July 9, 2007 || Reedy Creek || J. Broughton || — || align=right | 1.9 km || 
|-id=629 bgcolor=#d6d6d6
| 293629 ||  || — || July 14, 2007 || Dauban || Chante-Perdrix Obs. || — || align=right | 7.3 km || 
|-id=630 bgcolor=#fefefe
| 293630 ||  || — || July 10, 2007 || Reedy Creek || J. Broughton || — || align=right | 1.4 km || 
|-id=631 bgcolor=#fefefe
| 293631 ||  || — || July 15, 2007 || Tiki || S. F. Hönig, N. Teamo || V || align=right data-sort-value="0.99" | 990 m || 
|-id=632 bgcolor=#fefefe
| 293632 ||  || — || July 20, 2007 || Tiki || S. F. Hönig, N. Teamo || NYS || align=right data-sort-value="0.88" | 880 m || 
|-id=633 bgcolor=#E9E9E9
| 293633 ||  || — || July 20, 2007 || La Sagra || OAM Obs. || — || align=right | 2.2 km || 
|-id=634 bgcolor=#d6d6d6
| 293634 ||  || — || July 21, 2007 || Lulin || LUSS || — || align=right | 3.9 km || 
|-id=635 bgcolor=#fefefe
| 293635 ||  || — || July 22, 2007 || Dauban || Chante-Perdrix Obs. || — || align=right | 1.5 km || 
|-id=636 bgcolor=#fefefe
| 293636 ||  || — || July 21, 2007 || Reedy Creek || J. Broughton || NYS || align=right | 1.1 km || 
|-id=637 bgcolor=#fefefe
| 293637 ||  || — || July 21, 2007 || Reedy Creek || J. Broughton || — || align=right | 1.1 km || 
|-id=638 bgcolor=#fefefe
| 293638 ||  || — || July 26, 2007 || Sandlot || G. Hug || MAS || align=right data-sort-value="0.96" | 960 m || 
|-id=639 bgcolor=#fefefe
| 293639 ||  || — || July 25, 2007 || Reedy Creek || J. Broughton || — || align=right | 1.1 km || 
|-id=640 bgcolor=#fefefe
| 293640 ||  || — || July 27, 2007 || Dauban || Chante-Perdrix Obs. || FLO || align=right data-sort-value="0.73" | 730 m || 
|-id=641 bgcolor=#d6d6d6
| 293641 ||  || — || July 23, 2007 || Črni Vrh || Črni Vrh || EUP || align=right | 7.5 km || 
|-id=642 bgcolor=#fefefe
| 293642 ||  || — || July 24, 2007 || Tiki || N. Teamo || NYS || align=right data-sort-value="0.65" | 650 m || 
|-id=643 bgcolor=#fefefe
| 293643 ||  || — || July 18, 2007 || Mount Lemmon || Mount Lemmon Survey || — || align=right | 1.1 km || 
|-id=644 bgcolor=#fefefe
| 293644 ||  || — || July 19, 2007 || Mount Lemmon || Mount Lemmon Survey || — || align=right | 1.3 km || 
|-id=645 bgcolor=#fefefe
| 293645 || 2007 PE || — || August 4, 2007 || Pla D'Arguines || R. Ferrando || V || align=right data-sort-value="0.89" | 890 m || 
|-id=646 bgcolor=#fefefe
| 293646 ||  || — || August 5, 2007 || Dauban || Chante-Perdrix Obs. || FLO || align=right data-sort-value="0.90" | 900 m || 
|-id=647 bgcolor=#fefefe
| 293647 ||  || — || August 7, 2007 || Reedy Creek || J. Broughton || — || align=right | 1.5 km || 
|-id=648 bgcolor=#FA8072
| 293648 ||  || — || August 7, 2007 || Reedy Creek || J. Broughton || — || align=right data-sort-value="0.82" | 820 m || 
|-id=649 bgcolor=#fefefe
| 293649 ||  || — || August 6, 2007 || Siding Spring || SSS || PHO || align=right | 1.6 km || 
|-id=650 bgcolor=#fefefe
| 293650 ||  || — || August 9, 2007 || Socorro || LINEAR || NYS || align=right data-sort-value="0.94" | 940 m || 
|-id=651 bgcolor=#d6d6d6
| 293651 ||  || — || August 5, 2007 || Socorro || LINEAR || TIR || align=right | 4.2 km || 
|-id=652 bgcolor=#fefefe
| 293652 ||  || — || August 12, 2007 || Pla D'Arguines || R. Ferrando || — || align=right | 1.0 km || 
|-id=653 bgcolor=#fefefe
| 293653 ||  || — || August 9, 2007 || Kitt Peak || Spacewatch || — || align=right data-sort-value="0.92" | 920 m || 
|-id=654 bgcolor=#E9E9E9
| 293654 ||  || — || August 12, 2007 || Purple Mountain || PMO NEO || — || align=right | 1.4 km || 
|-id=655 bgcolor=#fefefe
| 293655 ||  || — || August 8, 2007 || Socorro || LINEAR || — || align=right | 2.3 km || 
|-id=656 bgcolor=#fefefe
| 293656 ||  || — || August 8, 2007 || Socorro || LINEAR || — || align=right data-sort-value="0.98" | 980 m || 
|-id=657 bgcolor=#fefefe
| 293657 ||  || — || August 8, 2007 || Socorro || LINEAR || ERI || align=right | 2.0 km || 
|-id=658 bgcolor=#fefefe
| 293658 ||  || — || August 8, 2007 || Socorro || LINEAR || NYS || align=right | 1.2 km || 
|-id=659 bgcolor=#fefefe
| 293659 ||  || — || August 8, 2007 || Socorro || LINEAR || NYS || align=right data-sort-value="0.88" | 880 m || 
|-id=660 bgcolor=#fefefe
| 293660 ||  || — || August 8, 2007 || Socorro || LINEAR || ERI || align=right | 2.3 km || 
|-id=661 bgcolor=#d6d6d6
| 293661 ||  || — || August 8, 2007 || Socorro || LINEAR || TIR || align=right | 4.6 km || 
|-id=662 bgcolor=#fefefe
| 293662 ||  || — || August 8, 2007 || Socorro || LINEAR || — || align=right | 1.1 km || 
|-id=663 bgcolor=#fefefe
| 293663 ||  || — || August 9, 2007 || Socorro || LINEAR || — || align=right | 1.2 km || 
|-id=664 bgcolor=#fefefe
| 293664 ||  || — || August 9, 2007 || Socorro || LINEAR || NYS || align=right data-sort-value="0.87" | 870 m || 
|-id=665 bgcolor=#fefefe
| 293665 ||  || — || August 9, 2007 || Socorro || LINEAR || V || align=right data-sort-value="0.93" | 930 m || 
|-id=666 bgcolor=#fefefe
| 293666 ||  || — || August 9, 2007 || Socorro || LINEAR || — || align=right | 1.1 km || 
|-id=667 bgcolor=#fefefe
| 293667 ||  || — || August 9, 2007 || Socorro || LINEAR || — || align=right data-sort-value="0.85" | 850 m || 
|-id=668 bgcolor=#fefefe
| 293668 ||  || — || August 9, 2007 || Kitt Peak || Spacewatch || — || align=right | 1.2 km || 
|-id=669 bgcolor=#fefefe
| 293669 ||  || — || August 10, 2007 || Kitt Peak || Spacewatch || FLO || align=right data-sort-value="0.82" | 820 m || 
|-id=670 bgcolor=#E9E9E9
| 293670 ||  || — || August 11, 2007 || Socorro || LINEAR || — || align=right | 1.3 km || 
|-id=671 bgcolor=#fefefe
| 293671 ||  || — || August 11, 2007 || Socorro || LINEAR || — || align=right | 1.0 km || 
|-id=672 bgcolor=#E9E9E9
| 293672 ||  || — || August 11, 2007 || Socorro || LINEAR || JUN || align=right | 1.3 km || 
|-id=673 bgcolor=#fefefe
| 293673 ||  || — || August 12, 2007 || Socorro || LINEAR || V || align=right data-sort-value="0.80" | 800 m || 
|-id=674 bgcolor=#fefefe
| 293674 ||  || — || August 9, 2007 || Reedy Creek || J. Broughton || — || align=right data-sort-value="0.93" | 930 m || 
|-id=675 bgcolor=#E9E9E9
| 293675 ||  || — || August 8, 2007 || Socorro || LINEAR || — || align=right | 2.4 km || 
|-id=676 bgcolor=#fefefe
| 293676 ||  || — || August 10, 2007 || Kitt Peak || Spacewatch || — || align=right | 1.6 km || 
|-id=677 bgcolor=#fefefe
| 293677 ||  || — || August 7, 2007 || Palomar || Palomar Obs. || NYS || align=right data-sort-value="0.70" | 700 m || 
|-id=678 bgcolor=#fefefe
| 293678 ||  || — || August 10, 2007 || Tiki || S. F. Hönig, N. Teamo || — || align=right | 1.1 km || 
|-id=679 bgcolor=#E9E9E9
| 293679 ||  || — || August 14, 2007 || Altschwendt || W. Ries || — || align=right | 1.8 km || 
|-id=680 bgcolor=#d6d6d6
| 293680 ||  || — || August 5, 2007 || Socorro || LINEAR || — || align=right | 6.2 km || 
|-id=681 bgcolor=#fefefe
| 293681 ||  || — || August 8, 2007 || Socorro || LINEAR || — || align=right data-sort-value="0.93" | 930 m || 
|-id=682 bgcolor=#fefefe
| 293682 ||  || — || August 10, 2007 || Kitt Peak || Spacewatch || — || align=right | 1.2 km || 
|-id=683 bgcolor=#E9E9E9
| 293683 ||  || — || August 12, 2007 || Socorro || LINEAR || MAR || align=right | 1.4 km || 
|-id=684 bgcolor=#d6d6d6
| 293684 ||  || — || August 12, 2007 || Socorro || LINEAR || EUP || align=right | 7.1 km || 
|-id=685 bgcolor=#E9E9E9
| 293685 ||  || — || August 10, 2007 || Kitt Peak || Spacewatch || DOR || align=right | 3.3 km || 
|-id=686 bgcolor=#fefefe
| 293686 ||  || — || August 12, 2007 || Socorro || LINEAR || — || align=right data-sort-value="0.98" | 980 m || 
|-id=687 bgcolor=#fefefe
| 293687 ||  || — || August 12, 2007 || Socorro || LINEAR || FLO || align=right data-sort-value="0.83" | 830 m || 
|-id=688 bgcolor=#fefefe
| 293688 ||  || — || August 9, 2007 || Socorro || LINEAR || NYS || align=right data-sort-value="0.85" | 850 m || 
|-id=689 bgcolor=#fefefe
| 293689 ||  || — || August 9, 2007 || Kitt Peak || Spacewatch || FLO || align=right data-sort-value="0.71" | 710 m || 
|-id=690 bgcolor=#fefefe
| 293690 ||  || — || August 9, 2007 || Socorro || LINEAR || — || align=right | 1.2 km || 
|-id=691 bgcolor=#E9E9E9
| 293691 ||  || — || August 9, 2007 || Socorro || LINEAR || — || align=right | 1.2 km || 
|-id=692 bgcolor=#fefefe
| 293692 ||  || — || August 12, 2007 || Purple Mountain || PMO NEO || — || align=right data-sort-value="0.71" | 710 m || 
|-id=693 bgcolor=#fefefe
| 293693 ||  || — || August 13, 2007 || Socorro || LINEAR || FLO || align=right data-sort-value="0.76" | 760 m || 
|-id=694 bgcolor=#E9E9E9
| 293694 ||  || — || August 12, 2007 || Bergisch Gladbach || W. Bickel || — || align=right data-sort-value="0.96" | 960 m || 
|-id=695 bgcolor=#E9E9E9
| 293695 ||  || — || August 14, 2007 || Bergisch Gladbac || W. Bickel || — || align=right | 2.0 km || 
|-id=696 bgcolor=#fefefe
| 293696 ||  || — || August 15, 2007 || La Sagra || OAM Obs. || — || align=right | 1.1 km || 
|-id=697 bgcolor=#fefefe
| 293697 ||  || — || August 13, 2007 || Socorro || LINEAR || V || align=right | 1.1 km || 
|-id=698 bgcolor=#fefefe
| 293698 ||  || — || August 13, 2007 || Socorro || LINEAR || NYS || align=right data-sort-value="0.73" | 730 m || 
|-id=699 bgcolor=#E9E9E9
| 293699 ||  || — || August 14, 2007 || La Sagra || OAM Obs. || CLO || align=right | 2.6 km || 
|-id=700 bgcolor=#fefefe
| 293700 ||  || — || August 6, 2007 || Socorro || LINEAR || — || align=right | 1.6 km || 
|}

293701–293800 

|-bgcolor=#fefefe
| 293701 ||  || — || August 10, 2007 || Kitt Peak || Spacewatch || — || align=right data-sort-value="0.75" | 750 m || 
|-id=702 bgcolor=#E9E9E9
| 293702 ||  || — || August 11, 2007 || Siding Spring || SSS || MAR || align=right | 1.6 km || 
|-id=703 bgcolor=#fefefe
| 293703 ||  || — || August 9, 2007 || Socorro || LINEAR || — || align=right data-sort-value="0.87" | 870 m || 
|-id=704 bgcolor=#fefefe
| 293704 || 2007 QG || — || August 16, 2007 || Bisei SG Center || BATTeRS || V || align=right data-sort-value="0.91" | 910 m || 
|-id=705 bgcolor=#E9E9E9
| 293705 || 2007 QK || — || August 16, 2007 || Great Shefford || P. Birtwhistle || TIN || align=right | 1.5 km || 
|-id=706 bgcolor=#fefefe
| 293706 ||  || — || August 19, 2007 || Bisei SG Center || BATTeRS || — || align=right | 1.2 km || 
|-id=707 bgcolor=#fefefe
| 293707 Govoradloanatoly ||  ||  || August 16, 2007 || Andrushivka || Andrushivka Obs. || V || align=right data-sort-value="0.77" | 770 m || 
|-id=708 bgcolor=#fefefe
| 293708 ||  || — || August 21, 2007 || Anderson Mesa || LONEOS || V || align=right data-sort-value="0.99" | 990 m || 
|-id=709 bgcolor=#fefefe
| 293709 ||  || — || August 21, 2007 || Anderson Mesa || LONEOS || V || align=right data-sort-value="0.78" | 780 m || 
|-id=710 bgcolor=#fefefe
| 293710 ||  || — || August 22, 2007 || Socorro || LINEAR || — || align=right data-sort-value="0.90" | 900 m || 
|-id=711 bgcolor=#fefefe
| 293711 ||  || — || August 22, 2007 || Socorro || LINEAR || FLO || align=right data-sort-value="0.66" | 660 m || 
|-id=712 bgcolor=#fefefe
| 293712 ||  || — || August 22, 2007 || Socorro || LINEAR || NYS || align=right | 1.7 km || 
|-id=713 bgcolor=#E9E9E9
| 293713 ||  || — || August 16, 2007 || Purple Mountain || PMO NEO || — || align=right | 2.8 km || 
|-id=714 bgcolor=#fefefe
| 293714 ||  || — || August 21, 2007 || Anderson Mesa || LONEOS || — || align=right data-sort-value="0.90" | 900 m || 
|-id=715 bgcolor=#fefefe
| 293715 ||  || — || August 16, 2007 || Purple Mountain || PMO NEO || — || align=right | 1.3 km || 
|-id=716 bgcolor=#d6d6d6
| 293716 ||  || — || August 22, 2007 || Socorro || LINEAR || — || align=right | 3.3 km || 
|-id=717 bgcolor=#fefefe
| 293717 ||  || — || August 24, 2007 || Kitt Peak || Spacewatch || — || align=right data-sort-value="0.99" | 990 m || 
|-id=718 bgcolor=#fefefe
| 293718 || 2007 RP || — || September 1, 2007 || Siding Spring || K. Sárneczky, L. Kiss || NYS || align=right data-sort-value="0.67" | 670 m || 
|-id=719 bgcolor=#fefefe
| 293719 ||  || — || September 1, 2007 || Siding Spring || K. Sárneczky, L. Kiss || — || align=right data-sort-value="0.71" | 710 m || 
|-id=720 bgcolor=#E9E9E9
| 293720 ||  || — || September 1, 2007 || Siding Spring || K. Sárneczky, L. Kiss || — || align=right | 2.9 km || 
|-id=721 bgcolor=#d6d6d6
| 293721 ||  || — || September 3, 2007 || Catalina || CSS || — || align=right | 2.7 km || 
|-id=722 bgcolor=#fefefe
| 293722 ||  || — || September 3, 2007 || La Sagra || OAM Obs. || MAS || align=right data-sort-value="0.89" | 890 m || 
|-id=723 bgcolor=#fefefe
| 293723 ||  || — || September 11, 2007 || Eskridge || G. Hug || FLO || align=right data-sort-value="0.74" | 740 m || 
|-id=724 bgcolor=#E9E9E9
| 293724 ||  || — || September 12, 2007 || CBA-NOVAC || D. R. Skillman || — || align=right data-sort-value="0.91" | 910 m || 
|-id=725 bgcolor=#fefefe
| 293725 ||  || — || September 12, 2007 || Goodricke-Pigott || R. A. Tucker || V || align=right data-sort-value="0.88" | 880 m || 
|-id=726 bgcolor=#FFC2E0
| 293726 ||  || — || September 13, 2007 || Mount Lemmon || Mount Lemmon Survey || APOcritical || align=right data-sort-value="0.11" | 110 m || 
|-id=727 bgcolor=#fefefe
| 293727 ||  || — || September 12, 2007 || Bisei SG Center || BATTeRS || FLO || align=right data-sort-value="0.79" | 790 m || 
|-id=728 bgcolor=#fefefe
| 293728 ||  || — || September 3, 2007 || Catalina || CSS || — || align=right data-sort-value="0.78" | 780 m || 
|-id=729 bgcolor=#E9E9E9
| 293729 ||  || — || September 3, 2007 || Catalina || CSS || — || align=right | 1.5 km || 
|-id=730 bgcolor=#E9E9E9
| 293730 ||  || — || September 4, 2007 || Mount Lemmon || Mount Lemmon Survey || — || align=right | 1.4 km || 
|-id=731 bgcolor=#fefefe
| 293731 ||  || — || September 4, 2007 || Mount Lemmon || Mount Lemmon Survey || — || align=right data-sort-value="0.75" | 750 m || 
|-id=732 bgcolor=#fefefe
| 293732 ||  || — || September 4, 2007 || Catalina || CSS || — || align=right data-sort-value="0.76" | 760 m || 
|-id=733 bgcolor=#E9E9E9
| 293733 ||  || — || September 5, 2007 || Mount Lemmon || Mount Lemmon Survey || EUN || align=right | 1.7 km || 
|-id=734 bgcolor=#fefefe
| 293734 ||  || — || September 5, 2007 || Catalina || CSS || — || align=right | 1.0 km || 
|-id=735 bgcolor=#fefefe
| 293735 ||  || — || September 5, 2007 || Catalina || CSS || — || align=right data-sort-value="0.98" | 980 m || 
|-id=736 bgcolor=#E9E9E9
| 293736 ||  || — || September 5, 2007 || Mount Lemmon || Mount Lemmon Survey || — || align=right | 2.2 km || 
|-id=737 bgcolor=#E9E9E9
| 293737 ||  || — || September 8, 2007 || Anderson Mesa || LONEOS || — || align=right | 2.2 km || 
|-id=738 bgcolor=#fefefe
| 293738 ||  || — || September 8, 2007 || Anderson Mesa || LONEOS || NYS || align=right data-sort-value="0.91" | 910 m || 
|-id=739 bgcolor=#fefefe
| 293739 ||  || — || September 8, 2007 || Anderson Mesa || LONEOS || NYS || align=right data-sort-value="0.88" | 880 m || 
|-id=740 bgcolor=#fefefe
| 293740 ||  || — || September 8, 2007 || Anderson Mesa || LONEOS || — || align=right | 1.3 km || 
|-id=741 bgcolor=#fefefe
| 293741 ||  || — || September 9, 2007 || Kitt Peak || Spacewatch || — || align=right | 1.2 km || 
|-id=742 bgcolor=#E9E9E9
| 293742 ||  || — || September 9, 2007 || Kitt Peak || Spacewatch || — || align=right | 2.8 km || 
|-id=743 bgcolor=#fefefe
| 293743 ||  || — || September 9, 2007 || Kitt Peak || Spacewatch || V || align=right data-sort-value="0.93" | 930 m || 
|-id=744 bgcolor=#fefefe
| 293744 ||  || — || September 9, 2007 || Kitt Peak || Spacewatch || ERI || align=right | 2.1 km || 
|-id=745 bgcolor=#E9E9E9
| 293745 ||  || — || September 9, 2007 || Kitt Peak || Spacewatch || — || align=right | 1.9 km || 
|-id=746 bgcolor=#fefefe
| 293746 ||  || — || September 9, 2007 || Mount Lemmon || Mount Lemmon Survey || — || align=right data-sort-value="0.86" | 860 m || 
|-id=747 bgcolor=#E9E9E9
| 293747 ||  || — || September 9, 2007 || Kitt Peak || Spacewatch || — || align=right | 1.6 km || 
|-id=748 bgcolor=#E9E9E9
| 293748 ||  || — || September 9, 2007 || Kitt Peak || Spacewatch || — || align=right | 2.9 km || 
|-id=749 bgcolor=#fefefe
| 293749 ||  || — || September 9, 2007 || Kitt Peak || Spacewatch || — || align=right | 1.4 km || 
|-id=750 bgcolor=#fefefe
| 293750 ||  || — || September 9, 2007 || Mount Lemmon || Mount Lemmon Survey || — || align=right data-sort-value="0.94" | 940 m || 
|-id=751 bgcolor=#E9E9E9
| 293751 ||  || — || September 9, 2007 || Mount Lemmon || Mount Lemmon Survey || — || align=right | 1.2 km || 
|-id=752 bgcolor=#E9E9E9
| 293752 ||  || — || September 10, 2007 || Kitt Peak || Spacewatch || — || align=right | 1.6 km || 
|-id=753 bgcolor=#fefefe
| 293753 ||  || — || September 10, 2007 || Catalina || CSS || CIM || align=right | 3.1 km || 
|-id=754 bgcolor=#E9E9E9
| 293754 ||  || — || September 10, 2007 || Mount Lemmon || Mount Lemmon Survey || — || align=right | 2.0 km || 
|-id=755 bgcolor=#E9E9E9
| 293755 ||  || — || September 10, 2007 || Mount Lemmon || Mount Lemmon Survey || — || align=right | 1.0 km || 
|-id=756 bgcolor=#E9E9E9
| 293756 ||  || — || September 10, 2007 || Mount Lemmon || Mount Lemmon Survey || MAR || align=right | 1.1 km || 
|-id=757 bgcolor=#fefefe
| 293757 ||  || — || September 10, 2007 || Mount Lemmon || Mount Lemmon Survey || MAS || align=right data-sort-value="0.84" | 840 m || 
|-id=758 bgcolor=#fefefe
| 293758 ||  || — || September 10, 2007 || Mount Lemmon || Mount Lemmon Survey || NYS || align=right data-sort-value="0.60" | 600 m || 
|-id=759 bgcolor=#fefefe
| 293759 ||  || — || September 10, 2007 || Mount Lemmon || Mount Lemmon Survey || — || align=right data-sort-value="0.90" | 900 m || 
|-id=760 bgcolor=#E9E9E9
| 293760 ||  || — || September 10, 2007 || Mount Lemmon || Mount Lemmon Survey || — || align=right data-sort-value="0.96" | 960 m || 
|-id=761 bgcolor=#fefefe
| 293761 ||  || — || September 10, 2007 || Mount Lemmon || Mount Lemmon Survey || — || align=right | 1.2 km || 
|-id=762 bgcolor=#fefefe
| 293762 ||  || — || September 10, 2007 || Mount Lemmon || Mount Lemmon Survey || — || align=right data-sort-value="0.90" | 900 m || 
|-id=763 bgcolor=#E9E9E9
| 293763 ||  || — || September 10, 2007 || Kitt Peak || Spacewatch || — || align=right data-sort-value="0.98" | 980 m || 
|-id=764 bgcolor=#E9E9E9
| 293764 ||  || — || September 10, 2007 || Kitt Peak || Spacewatch || AGN || align=right | 1.4 km || 
|-id=765 bgcolor=#E9E9E9
| 293765 ||  || — || September 10, 2007 || Kitt Peak || Spacewatch || — || align=right | 1.5 km || 
|-id=766 bgcolor=#fefefe
| 293766 ||  || — || September 10, 2007 || Kitt Peak || Spacewatch || MAS || align=right | 1.0 km || 
|-id=767 bgcolor=#fefefe
| 293767 ||  || — || September 10, 2007 || Kitt Peak || Spacewatch || NYS || align=right | 1.0 km || 
|-id=768 bgcolor=#E9E9E9
| 293768 ||  || — || September 10, 2007 || Kitt Peak || Spacewatch || — || align=right | 1.8 km || 
|-id=769 bgcolor=#d6d6d6
| 293769 ||  || — || September 10, 2007 || Kitt Peak || Spacewatch || — || align=right | 2.8 km || 
|-id=770 bgcolor=#fefefe
| 293770 ||  || — || September 11, 2007 || Catalina || CSS || NYS || align=right data-sort-value="0.83" | 830 m || 
|-id=771 bgcolor=#fefefe
| 293771 ||  || — || September 11, 2007 || Catalina || CSS || — || align=right data-sort-value="0.90" | 900 m || 
|-id=772 bgcolor=#fefefe
| 293772 ||  || — || September 11, 2007 || Catalina || CSS || NYS || align=right data-sort-value="0.83" | 830 m || 
|-id=773 bgcolor=#d6d6d6
| 293773 ||  || — || September 11, 2007 || Mount Lemmon || Mount Lemmon Survey || THM || align=right | 3.0 km || 
|-id=774 bgcolor=#fefefe
| 293774 ||  || — || September 11, 2007 || Mount Lemmon || Mount Lemmon Survey || — || align=right data-sort-value="0.79" | 790 m || 
|-id=775 bgcolor=#fefefe
| 293775 ||  || — || September 11, 2007 || Kitt Peak || Spacewatch || V || align=right data-sort-value="0.87" | 870 m || 
|-id=776 bgcolor=#fefefe
| 293776 ||  || — || September 11, 2007 || Kitt Peak || Spacewatch || — || align=right | 1.0 km || 
|-id=777 bgcolor=#E9E9E9
| 293777 ||  || — || September 11, 2007 || Kitt Peak || Spacewatch || — || align=right | 1.7 km || 
|-id=778 bgcolor=#E9E9E9
| 293778 ||  || — || September 11, 2007 || Kitt Peak || Spacewatch || EUN || align=right | 1.2 km || 
|-id=779 bgcolor=#d6d6d6
| 293779 ||  || — || September 11, 2007 || Purple Mountain || PMO NEO || BRA || align=right | 2.0 km || 
|-id=780 bgcolor=#E9E9E9
| 293780 ||  || — || September 12, 2007 || Mount Lemmon || Mount Lemmon Survey || — || align=right | 2.3 km || 
|-id=781 bgcolor=#fefefe
| 293781 ||  || — || September 12, 2007 || Catalina || CSS || — || align=right data-sort-value="0.82" | 820 m || 
|-id=782 bgcolor=#E9E9E9
| 293782 ||  || — || September 12, 2007 || Mount Lemmon || Mount Lemmon Survey || — || align=right | 1.9 km || 
|-id=783 bgcolor=#fefefe
| 293783 ||  || — || September 12, 2007 || Catalina || CSS || — || align=right | 1.5 km || 
|-id=784 bgcolor=#d6d6d6
| 293784 ||  || — || September 12, 2007 || Mount Lemmon || Mount Lemmon Survey || — || align=right | 2.8 km || 
|-id=785 bgcolor=#fefefe
| 293785 ||  || — || September 12, 2007 || Mount Lemmon || Mount Lemmon Survey || — || align=right data-sort-value="0.83" | 830 m || 
|-id=786 bgcolor=#fefefe
| 293786 ||  || — || September 12, 2007 || Mount Lemmon || Mount Lemmon Survey || NYS || align=right data-sort-value="0.88" | 880 m || 
|-id=787 bgcolor=#fefefe
| 293787 ||  || — || September 11, 2007 || Purple Mountain || PMO NEO || NYS || align=right | 2.3 km || 
|-id=788 bgcolor=#fefefe
| 293788 ||  || — || September 12, 2007 || Catalina || CSS || FLO || align=right data-sort-value="0.65" | 650 m || 
|-id=789 bgcolor=#E9E9E9
| 293789 ||  || — || September 14, 2007 || Mount Lemmon || Mount Lemmon Survey || AGN || align=right | 1.2 km || 
|-id=790 bgcolor=#fefefe
| 293790 ||  || — || September 14, 2007 || Mount Lemmon || Mount Lemmon Survey || MAS || align=right | 1.1 km || 
|-id=791 bgcolor=#fefefe
| 293791 ||  || — || September 7, 2007 || Socorro || LINEAR || — || align=right data-sort-value="0.94" | 940 m || 
|-id=792 bgcolor=#E9E9E9
| 293792 ||  || — || September 13, 2007 || Socorro || LINEAR || — || align=right | 1.2 km || 
|-id=793 bgcolor=#fefefe
| 293793 ||  || — || September 13, 2007 || Socorro || LINEAR || NYS || align=right data-sort-value="0.89" | 890 m || 
|-id=794 bgcolor=#fefefe
| 293794 ||  || — || September 13, 2007 || Socorro || LINEAR || — || align=right data-sort-value="0.86" | 860 m || 
|-id=795 bgcolor=#E9E9E9
| 293795 ||  || — || September 13, 2007 || Socorro || LINEAR || — || align=right | 1.2 km || 
|-id=796 bgcolor=#E9E9E9
| 293796 ||  || — || September 13, 2007 || Socorro || LINEAR || IAN || align=right | 1.5 km || 
|-id=797 bgcolor=#E9E9E9
| 293797 ||  || — || September 13, 2007 || Socorro || LINEAR || — || align=right | 1.9 km || 
|-id=798 bgcolor=#E9E9E9
| 293798 ||  || — || September 14, 2007 || Socorro || LINEAR || — || align=right | 1.7 km || 
|-id=799 bgcolor=#fefefe
| 293799 ||  || — || September 15, 2007 || Socorro || LINEAR || — || align=right data-sort-value="0.86" | 860 m || 
|-id=800 bgcolor=#E9E9E9
| 293800 ||  || — || September 11, 2007 || Purple Mountain || PMO NEO || — || align=right | 1.1 km || 
|}

293801–293900 

|-bgcolor=#fefefe
| 293801 ||  || — || September 11, 2007 || Purple Mountain || PMO NEO || V || align=right data-sort-value="0.90" | 900 m || 
|-id=802 bgcolor=#fefefe
| 293802 ||  || — || September 12, 2007 || Catalina || CSS || — || align=right data-sort-value="0.96" | 960 m || 
|-id=803 bgcolor=#d6d6d6
| 293803 ||  || — || September 10, 2007 || Kitt Peak || Spacewatch || — || align=right | 3.9 km || 
|-id=804 bgcolor=#E9E9E9
| 293804 ||  || — || September 10, 2007 || Kitt Peak || Spacewatch || — || align=right data-sort-value="0.67" | 670 m || 
|-id=805 bgcolor=#E9E9E9
| 293805 ||  || — || September 10, 2007 || Catalina || CSS || — || align=right | 3.2 km || 
|-id=806 bgcolor=#E9E9E9
| 293806 ||  || — || September 10, 2007 || Catalina || CSS || — || align=right data-sort-value="0.88" | 880 m || 
|-id=807 bgcolor=#fefefe
| 293807 ||  || — || September 12, 2007 || Mount Lemmon || Mount Lemmon Survey || MAS || align=right data-sort-value="0.93" | 930 m || 
|-id=808 bgcolor=#fefefe
| 293808 ||  || — || September 13, 2007 || Anderson Mesa || LONEOS || — || align=right | 1.2 km || 
|-id=809 bgcolor=#E9E9E9
| 293809 Zugspitze ||  ||  || September 15, 2007 || Taunus || S. Karge, R. Kling || — || align=right | 1.9 km || 
|-id=810 bgcolor=#fefefe
| 293810 ||  || — || September 10, 2007 || Kitt Peak || Spacewatch || — || align=right | 1.2 km || 
|-id=811 bgcolor=#fefefe
| 293811 ||  || — || September 10, 2007 || Kitt Peak || Spacewatch || — || align=right | 1.0 km || 
|-id=812 bgcolor=#fefefe
| 293812 ||  || — || September 10, 2007 || Kitt Peak || Spacewatch || — || align=right data-sort-value="0.68" | 680 m || 
|-id=813 bgcolor=#E9E9E9
| 293813 ||  || — || September 10, 2007 || Kitt Peak || Spacewatch || — || align=right | 3.5 km || 
|-id=814 bgcolor=#d6d6d6
| 293814 ||  || — || September 10, 2007 || Kitt Peak || Spacewatch || — || align=right | 3.0 km || 
|-id=815 bgcolor=#d6d6d6
| 293815 ||  || — || September 10, 2007 || Kitt Peak || Spacewatch || — || align=right | 2.9 km || 
|-id=816 bgcolor=#E9E9E9
| 293816 ||  || — || September 10, 2007 || Kitt Peak || Spacewatch || — || align=right | 1.3 km || 
|-id=817 bgcolor=#E9E9E9
| 293817 ||  || — || September 10, 2007 || Kitt Peak || Spacewatch || — || align=right | 1.4 km || 
|-id=818 bgcolor=#fefefe
| 293818 ||  || — || September 10, 2007 || Mount Lemmon || Mount Lemmon Survey || NYS || align=right data-sort-value="0.89" | 890 m || 
|-id=819 bgcolor=#fefefe
| 293819 ||  || — || September 11, 2007 || Catalina || CSS || — || align=right | 1.5 km || 
|-id=820 bgcolor=#E9E9E9
| 293820 ||  || — || September 13, 2007 || Kitt Peak || Spacewatch || ADE || align=right | 2.4 km || 
|-id=821 bgcolor=#E9E9E9
| 293821 ||  || — || September 8, 2007 || Dauban || Chante-Perdrix Obs. || — || align=right | 2.3 km || 
|-id=822 bgcolor=#fefefe
| 293822 ||  || — || September 11, 2007 || Kitt Peak || Spacewatch || NYS || align=right data-sort-value="0.76" | 760 m || 
|-id=823 bgcolor=#d6d6d6
| 293823 ||  || — || September 12, 2007 || Kitt Peak || Spacewatch || — || align=right | 4.8 km || 
|-id=824 bgcolor=#E9E9E9
| 293824 ||  || — || September 12, 2007 || Kitt Peak || Spacewatch || — || align=right | 1.8 km || 
|-id=825 bgcolor=#fefefe
| 293825 ||  || — || September 13, 2007 || Kitt Peak || Spacewatch || NYS || align=right data-sort-value="0.78" | 780 m || 
|-id=826 bgcolor=#fefefe
| 293826 ||  || — || September 13, 2007 || Kitt Peak || Spacewatch || MAS || align=right data-sort-value="0.78" | 780 m || 
|-id=827 bgcolor=#E9E9E9
| 293827 ||  || — || September 8, 2007 || Anderson Mesa || LONEOS || EUN || align=right | 1.5 km || 
|-id=828 bgcolor=#d6d6d6
| 293828 ||  || — || September 9, 2007 || Kitt Peak || Spacewatch || — || align=right | 3.9 km || 
|-id=829 bgcolor=#fefefe
| 293829 ||  || — || September 9, 2007 || Kitt Peak || Spacewatch || FLO || align=right data-sort-value="0.82" | 820 m || 
|-id=830 bgcolor=#fefefe
| 293830 ||  || — || September 9, 2007 || Kitt Peak || Spacewatch || FLO || align=right data-sort-value="0.95" | 950 m || 
|-id=831 bgcolor=#E9E9E9
| 293831 ||  || — || September 9, 2007 || Kitt Peak || Spacewatch || — || align=right | 3.3 km || 
|-id=832 bgcolor=#fefefe
| 293832 ||  || — || September 10, 2007 || Kitt Peak || Spacewatch || V || align=right data-sort-value="0.98" | 980 m || 
|-id=833 bgcolor=#fefefe
| 293833 ||  || — || September 10, 2007 || Kitt Peak || Spacewatch || — || align=right data-sort-value="0.93" | 930 m || 
|-id=834 bgcolor=#E9E9E9
| 293834 ||  || — || September 10, 2007 || Kitt Peak || Spacewatch || HEN || align=right | 1.4 km || 
|-id=835 bgcolor=#d6d6d6
| 293835 ||  || — || September 10, 2007 || Kitt Peak || Spacewatch || EMA || align=right | 4.5 km || 
|-id=836 bgcolor=#E9E9E9
| 293836 ||  || — || September 10, 2007 || Kitt Peak || Spacewatch || — || align=right | 2.1 km || 
|-id=837 bgcolor=#E9E9E9
| 293837 ||  || — || September 10, 2007 || Kitt Peak || Spacewatch || — || align=right | 3.1 km || 
|-id=838 bgcolor=#E9E9E9
| 293838 ||  || — || September 11, 2007 || Kitt Peak || Spacewatch || PAD || align=right | 3.0 km || 
|-id=839 bgcolor=#E9E9E9
| 293839 ||  || — || September 11, 2007 || Kitt Peak || Spacewatch || — || align=right | 1.9 km || 
|-id=840 bgcolor=#E9E9E9
| 293840 ||  || — || September 12, 2007 || Mount Lemmon || Mount Lemmon Survey || — || align=right | 1.8 km || 
|-id=841 bgcolor=#d6d6d6
| 293841 ||  || — || September 13, 2007 || Catalina || CSS || — || align=right | 3.7 km || 
|-id=842 bgcolor=#fefefe
| 293842 ||  || — || September 13, 2007 || Catalina || CSS || FLO || align=right data-sort-value="0.99" | 990 m || 
|-id=843 bgcolor=#fefefe
| 293843 ||  || — || September 13, 2007 || Anderson Mesa || LONEOS || — || align=right data-sort-value="0.82" | 820 m || 
|-id=844 bgcolor=#E9E9E9
| 293844 ||  || — || September 13, 2007 || Mount Lemmon || Mount Lemmon Survey || — || align=right | 1.0 km || 
|-id=845 bgcolor=#E9E9E9
| 293845 ||  || — || September 10, 2007 || Kitt Peak || Spacewatch || — || align=right | 2.8 km || 
|-id=846 bgcolor=#E9E9E9
| 293846 ||  || — || September 10, 2007 || Kitt Peak || Spacewatch || — || align=right | 1.0 km || 
|-id=847 bgcolor=#E9E9E9
| 293847 ||  || — || September 10, 2007 || Mount Lemmon || Mount Lemmon Survey || VIB || align=right | 2.4 km || 
|-id=848 bgcolor=#fefefe
| 293848 ||  || — || September 11, 2007 || Kitt Peak || Spacewatch || V || align=right data-sort-value="0.87" | 870 m || 
|-id=849 bgcolor=#fefefe
| 293849 ||  || — || September 11, 2007 || Kitt Peak || Spacewatch || — || align=right data-sort-value="0.74" | 740 m || 
|-id=850 bgcolor=#E9E9E9
| 293850 ||  || — || September 12, 2007 || Catalina || CSS || DOR || align=right | 2.7 km || 
|-id=851 bgcolor=#fefefe
| 293851 ||  || — || September 12, 2007 || Mount Lemmon || Mount Lemmon Survey || FLO || align=right data-sort-value="0.83" | 830 m || 
|-id=852 bgcolor=#fefefe
| 293852 ||  || — || September 13, 2007 || Mount Lemmon || Mount Lemmon Survey || FLO || align=right data-sort-value="0.73" | 730 m || 
|-id=853 bgcolor=#E9E9E9
| 293853 ||  || — || September 13, 2007 || Mount Lemmon || Mount Lemmon Survey || — || align=right | 2.4 km || 
|-id=854 bgcolor=#fefefe
| 293854 ||  || — || September 14, 2007 || Catalina || CSS || FLO || align=right data-sort-value="0.76" | 760 m || 
|-id=855 bgcolor=#fefefe
| 293855 ||  || — || September 14, 2007 || Anderson Mesa || LONEOS || NYS || align=right data-sort-value="0.96" | 960 m || 
|-id=856 bgcolor=#E9E9E9
| 293856 ||  || — || September 22, 2003 || Palomar || NEAT || — || align=right | 1.7 km || 
|-id=857 bgcolor=#fefefe
| 293857 ||  || — || September 15, 2007 || Socorro || LINEAR || — || align=right | 1.7 km || 
|-id=858 bgcolor=#fefefe
| 293858 ||  || — || September 15, 2007 || Socorro || LINEAR || H || align=right data-sort-value="0.92" | 920 m || 
|-id=859 bgcolor=#fefefe
| 293859 ||  || — || September 15, 2007 || Socorro || LINEAR || — || align=right | 1.1 km || 
|-id=860 bgcolor=#E9E9E9
| 293860 ||  || — || September 15, 2007 || Socorro || LINEAR || — || align=right | 1.3 km || 
|-id=861 bgcolor=#E9E9E9
| 293861 ||  || — || September 11, 2007 || Kitt Peak || Spacewatch || RAF || align=right data-sort-value="0.88" | 880 m || 
|-id=862 bgcolor=#E9E9E9
| 293862 ||  || — || September 11, 2007 || Kitt Peak || Spacewatch || — || align=right | 1.6 km || 
|-id=863 bgcolor=#E9E9E9
| 293863 ||  || — || September 12, 2007 || Catalina || CSS || — || align=right | 3.2 km || 
|-id=864 bgcolor=#E9E9E9
| 293864 ||  || — || September 12, 2007 || Catalina || CSS || — || align=right | 2.4 km || 
|-id=865 bgcolor=#E9E9E9
| 293865 ||  || — || September 13, 2007 || Catalina || CSS || EUN || align=right | 1.2 km || 
|-id=866 bgcolor=#E9E9E9
| 293866 ||  || — || September 13, 2007 || Catalina || CSS || EUN || align=right | 1.8 km || 
|-id=867 bgcolor=#fefefe
| 293867 ||  || — || September 13, 2007 || Mount Lemmon || Mount Lemmon Survey || — || align=right data-sort-value="0.79" | 790 m || 
|-id=868 bgcolor=#fefefe
| 293868 ||  || — || September 14, 2007 || Mount Lemmon || Mount Lemmon Survey || — || align=right | 1.2 km || 
|-id=869 bgcolor=#fefefe
| 293869 ||  || — || September 14, 2007 || Mount Lemmon || Mount Lemmon Survey || — || align=right data-sort-value="0.82" | 820 m || 
|-id=870 bgcolor=#E9E9E9
| 293870 ||  || — || September 14, 2007 || Mount Lemmon || Mount Lemmon Survey || — || align=right | 1.7 km || 
|-id=871 bgcolor=#E9E9E9
| 293871 ||  || — || September 15, 2007 || Kitt Peak || Spacewatch || AGN || align=right | 1.4 km || 
|-id=872 bgcolor=#d6d6d6
| 293872 ||  || — || September 15, 2007 || Mount Lemmon || Mount Lemmon Survey || — || align=right | 2.5 km || 
|-id=873 bgcolor=#fefefe
| 293873 ||  || — || September 15, 2007 || Mount Lemmon || Mount Lemmon Survey || — || align=right data-sort-value="0.80" | 800 m || 
|-id=874 bgcolor=#E9E9E9
| 293874 ||  || — || September 15, 2007 || Kitt Peak || Spacewatch || — || align=right | 1.4 km || 
|-id=875 bgcolor=#fefefe
| 293875 ||  || — || September 15, 2007 || Kitt Peak || Spacewatch || FLO || align=right data-sort-value="0.72" | 720 m || 
|-id=876 bgcolor=#E9E9E9
| 293876 ||  || — || September 15, 2007 || Mount Lemmon || Mount Lemmon Survey || — || align=right | 4.0 km || 
|-id=877 bgcolor=#fefefe
| 293877 ||  || — || September 15, 2007 || Kitt Peak || Spacewatch || — || align=right | 1.0 km || 
|-id=878 bgcolor=#fefefe
| 293878 Tapping ||  ||  || September 9, 2007 || Mauna Kea || D. D. Balam || NYS || align=right data-sort-value="0.76" | 760 m || 
|-id=879 bgcolor=#fefefe
| 293879 ||  || — || September 5, 2007 || Catalina || CSS || — || align=right | 2.1 km || 
|-id=880 bgcolor=#E9E9E9
| 293880 ||  || — || September 9, 2007 || Mount Lemmon || Mount Lemmon Survey || JUN || align=right data-sort-value="0.97" | 970 m || 
|-id=881 bgcolor=#E9E9E9
| 293881 ||  || — || September 13, 2007 || Mount Lemmon || Mount Lemmon Survey || — || align=right | 1.4 km || 
|-id=882 bgcolor=#d6d6d6
| 293882 ||  || — || September 14, 2007 || Mount Lemmon || Mount Lemmon Survey || — || align=right | 3.2 km || 
|-id=883 bgcolor=#E9E9E9
| 293883 ||  || — || September 14, 2007 || Mount Lemmon || Mount Lemmon Survey || — || align=right | 1.5 km || 
|-id=884 bgcolor=#d6d6d6
| 293884 ||  || — || September 14, 2007 || Mount Lemmon || Mount Lemmon Survey || — || align=right | 3.3 km || 
|-id=885 bgcolor=#d6d6d6
| 293885 ||  || — || September 14, 2007 || Mount Lemmon || Mount Lemmon Survey || — || align=right | 3.7 km || 
|-id=886 bgcolor=#d6d6d6
| 293886 ||  || — || September 4, 2007 || Mount Lemmon || Mount Lemmon Survey || — || align=right | 3.2 km || 
|-id=887 bgcolor=#E9E9E9
| 293887 ||  || — || September 10, 2007 || Mount Lemmon || Mount Lemmon Survey || MAR || align=right | 1.8 km || 
|-id=888 bgcolor=#E9E9E9
| 293888 ||  || — || September 10, 2007 || Mount Lemmon || Mount Lemmon Survey || — || align=right | 1.3 km || 
|-id=889 bgcolor=#E9E9E9
| 293889 ||  || — || September 12, 2007 || Mount Lemmon || Mount Lemmon Survey || AST || align=right | 1.5 km || 
|-id=890 bgcolor=#d6d6d6
| 293890 ||  || — || September 13, 2007 || Mount Lemmon || Mount Lemmon Survey || — || align=right | 2.9 km || 
|-id=891 bgcolor=#d6d6d6
| 293891 ||  || — || September 13, 2007 || Mount Lemmon || Mount Lemmon Survey || KOR || align=right | 1.5 km || 
|-id=892 bgcolor=#fefefe
| 293892 ||  || — || September 3, 2007 || Catalina || CSS || — || align=right data-sort-value="0.79" | 790 m || 
|-id=893 bgcolor=#fefefe
| 293893 ||  || — || September 11, 2007 || Kitt Peak || Spacewatch || — || align=right data-sort-value="0.94" | 940 m || 
|-id=894 bgcolor=#d6d6d6
| 293894 ||  || — || September 3, 2007 || Catalina || CSS || — || align=right | 2.7 km || 
|-id=895 bgcolor=#fefefe
| 293895 ||  || — || September 10, 2007 || Mount Lemmon || Mount Lemmon Survey || — || align=right data-sort-value="0.58" | 580 m || 
|-id=896 bgcolor=#E9E9E9
| 293896 ||  || — || September 15, 2007 || Kitt Peak || Spacewatch || — || align=right | 1.7 km || 
|-id=897 bgcolor=#E9E9E9
| 293897 ||  || — || September 12, 2007 || Mount Lemmon || Mount Lemmon Survey || HEN || align=right | 1.1 km || 
|-id=898 bgcolor=#d6d6d6
| 293898 ||  || — || September 12, 2007 || Kitt Peak || Spacewatch || — || align=right | 3.5 km || 
|-id=899 bgcolor=#fefefe
| 293899 ||  || — || September 10, 2007 || Kitt Peak || Spacewatch || — || align=right data-sort-value="0.70" | 700 m || 
|-id=900 bgcolor=#d6d6d6
| 293900 ||  || — || September 12, 2007 || Catalina || CSS || — || align=right | 5.2 km || 
|}

293901–294000 

|-bgcolor=#E9E9E9
| 293901 ||  || — || September 13, 2007 || Mount Lemmon || Mount Lemmon Survey || — || align=right | 3.5 km || 
|-id=902 bgcolor=#fefefe
| 293902 ||  || — || September 10, 2007 || Kitt Peak || Spacewatch || — || align=right data-sort-value="0.67" | 670 m || 
|-id=903 bgcolor=#E9E9E9
| 293903 ||  || — || September 13, 2007 || Catalina || CSS || — || align=right | 2.0 km || 
|-id=904 bgcolor=#fefefe
| 293904 ||  || — || September 14, 2007 || Mount Lemmon || Mount Lemmon Survey || — || align=right data-sort-value="0.92" | 920 m || 
|-id=905 bgcolor=#E9E9E9
| 293905 ||  || — || September 15, 2007 || Catalina || CSS || MAR || align=right | 1.5 km || 
|-id=906 bgcolor=#E9E9E9
| 293906 ||  || — || September 10, 2007 || Mount Lemmon || Mount Lemmon Survey || HEN || align=right | 1.2 km || 
|-id=907 bgcolor=#fefefe
| 293907 ||  || — || September 13, 2007 || Catalina || CSS || H || align=right data-sort-value="0.72" | 720 m || 
|-id=908 bgcolor=#d6d6d6
| 293908 ||  || — || September 18, 2007 || Mayhill || A. Lowe || — || align=right | 6.0 km || 
|-id=909 bgcolor=#d6d6d6
| 293909 Matterhorn ||  ||  || September 16, 2007 || Taunus || S. Karge, R. Kling || — || align=right | 3.4 km || 
|-id=910 bgcolor=#E9E9E9
| 293910 ||  || — || September 18, 2007 || Socorro || LINEAR || — || align=right | 1.9 km || 
|-id=911 bgcolor=#fefefe
| 293911 ||  || — || September 18, 2007 || Socorro || LINEAR || — || align=right | 1.5 km || 
|-id=912 bgcolor=#fefefe
| 293912 ||  || — || September 21, 2007 || Socorro || LINEAR || — || align=right | 1.1 km || 
|-id=913 bgcolor=#fefefe
| 293913 ||  || — || September 18, 2007 || Kitt Peak || Spacewatch || MAS || align=right data-sort-value="0.90" | 900 m || 
|-id=914 bgcolor=#E9E9E9
| 293914 ||  || — || September 19, 2007 || Kitt Peak || Spacewatch || HEN || align=right | 1.3 km || 
|-id=915 bgcolor=#E9E9E9
| 293915 ||  || — || September 20, 2007 || Catalina || CSS || EUN || align=right | 2.3 km || 
|-id=916 bgcolor=#E9E9E9
| 293916 ||  || — || September 19, 2007 || Kitt Peak || Spacewatch || — || align=right | 1.8 km || 
|-id=917 bgcolor=#E9E9E9
| 293917 ||  || — || September 19, 2007 || Kitt Peak || Spacewatch || — || align=right | 2.8 km || 
|-id=918 bgcolor=#E9E9E9
| 293918 ||  || — || September 20, 2007 || Kitt Peak || Spacewatch || — || align=right data-sort-value="0.86" | 860 m || 
|-id=919 bgcolor=#d6d6d6
| 293919 ||  || — || September 30, 2007 || Kitt Peak || Spacewatch || — || align=right | 5.1 km || 
|-id=920 bgcolor=#E9E9E9
| 293920 ||  || — || September 30, 2007 || Kitt Peak || Spacewatch || — || align=right | 1.0 km || 
|-id=921 bgcolor=#E9E9E9
| 293921 ||  || — || September 30, 2007 || Kitt Peak || Spacewatch || — || align=right data-sort-value="0.99" | 990 m || 
|-id=922 bgcolor=#E9E9E9
| 293922 ||  || — || September 20, 2007 || Kitt Peak || Spacewatch || — || align=right | 2.6 km || 
|-id=923 bgcolor=#E9E9E9
| 293923 ||  || — || September 19, 2007 || Socorro || LINEAR || — || align=right | 1.8 km || 
|-id=924 bgcolor=#E9E9E9
| 293924 ||  || — || September 21, 2007 || Socorro || LINEAR || — || align=right | 1.6 km || 
|-id=925 bgcolor=#fefefe
| 293925 ||  || — || September 25, 2007 || Mount Lemmon || Mount Lemmon Survey || V || align=right data-sort-value="0.88" | 880 m || 
|-id=926 bgcolor=#fefefe
| 293926 Harrystine ||  ||  || October 2, 2007 || Charleston || ARO || NYS || align=right data-sort-value="0.82" | 820 m || 
|-id=927 bgcolor=#E9E9E9
| 293927 ||  || — || October 4, 2007 || Mount Lemmon || Mount Lemmon Survey || — || align=right | 1.0 km || 
|-id=928 bgcolor=#E9E9E9
| 293928 ||  || — || October 4, 2007 || Kitt Peak || Spacewatch || — || align=right | 1.3 km || 
|-id=929 bgcolor=#E9E9E9
| 293929 ||  || — || October 6, 2007 || Pla D'Arguines || R. Ferrando || JNS || align=right | 2.3 km || 
|-id=930 bgcolor=#E9E9E9
| 293930 ||  || — || October 6, 2007 || 7300 || W. K. Y. Yeung || EUN || align=right | 3.3 km || 
|-id=931 bgcolor=#fefefe
| 293931 ||  || — || October 6, 2007 || Socorro || LINEAR || NYS || align=right | 1.9 km || 
|-id=932 bgcolor=#E9E9E9
| 293932 ||  || — || October 6, 2007 || Dauban || Chante-Perdrix Obs. || — || align=right | 2.6 km || 
|-id=933 bgcolor=#d6d6d6
| 293933 ||  || — || October 6, 2007 || La Sagra || OAM Obs. || EOS || align=right | 2.6 km || 
|-id=934 bgcolor=#fefefe
| 293934 MPIA ||  ||  || October 8, 2007 || Heidelberg || F. Hormuth || — || align=right | 1.0 km || 
|-id=935 bgcolor=#E9E9E9
| 293935 ||  || — || October 6, 2007 || Socorro || LINEAR || — || align=right | 1.9 km || 
|-id=936 bgcolor=#E9E9E9
| 293936 ||  || — || October 6, 2007 || Socorro || LINEAR || — || align=right | 2.7 km || 
|-id=937 bgcolor=#E9E9E9
| 293937 ||  || — || October 6, 2007 || Socorro || LINEAR || — || align=right | 1.1 km || 
|-id=938 bgcolor=#E9E9E9
| 293938 ||  || — || October 6, 2007 || Socorro || LINEAR || — || align=right | 2.0 km || 
|-id=939 bgcolor=#fefefe
| 293939 ||  || — || October 6, 2007 || Socorro || LINEAR || — || align=right | 1.2 km || 
|-id=940 bgcolor=#FA8072
| 293940 ||  || — || October 6, 2007 || Socorro || LINEAR || — || align=right | 1.1 km || 
|-id=941 bgcolor=#fefefe
| 293941 ||  || — || October 7, 2007 || Socorro || LINEAR || MAS || align=right data-sort-value="0.92" | 920 m || 
|-id=942 bgcolor=#E9E9E9
| 293942 ||  || — || October 4, 2007 || Kitt Peak || Spacewatch || — || align=right | 1.9 km || 
|-id=943 bgcolor=#E9E9E9
| 293943 ||  || — || October 8, 2007 || Črni Vrh || Črni Vrh || — || align=right | 2.3 km || 
|-id=944 bgcolor=#E9E9E9
| 293944 ||  || — || October 9, 2007 || Eskridge || G. Hug || — || align=right | 1.5 km || 
|-id=945 bgcolor=#E9E9E9
| 293945 ||  || — || October 6, 2007 || Socorro || LINEAR || — || align=right | 2.4 km || 
|-id=946 bgcolor=#E9E9E9
| 293946 ||  || — || October 6, 2007 || Socorro || LINEAR || JUN || align=right | 1.4 km || 
|-id=947 bgcolor=#d6d6d6
| 293947 ||  || — || October 10, 2007 || Mount Lemmon || Mount Lemmon Survey || EUP || align=right | 8.5 km || 
|-id=948 bgcolor=#E9E9E9
| 293948 ||  || — || October 7, 2007 || Catalina || CSS || — || align=right | 2.9 km || 
|-id=949 bgcolor=#d6d6d6
| 293949 ||  || — || October 4, 2007 || Kitt Peak || Spacewatch || CHA || align=right | 2.7 km || 
|-id=950 bgcolor=#fefefe
| 293950 ||  || — || October 4, 2007 || Kitt Peak || Spacewatch || NYS || align=right data-sort-value="0.84" | 840 m || 
|-id=951 bgcolor=#E9E9E9
| 293951 ||  || — || October 4, 2007 || Kitt Peak || Spacewatch || — || align=right | 2.1 km || 
|-id=952 bgcolor=#E9E9E9
| 293952 ||  || — || October 4, 2007 || Kitt Peak || Spacewatch || HOF || align=right | 3.1 km || 
|-id=953 bgcolor=#fefefe
| 293953 ||  || — || October 4, 2007 || Kitt Peak || Spacewatch || — || align=right | 1.4 km || 
|-id=954 bgcolor=#fefefe
| 293954 ||  || — || October 6, 2007 || Kitt Peak || Spacewatch || FLO || align=right data-sort-value="0.56" | 560 m || 
|-id=955 bgcolor=#E9E9E9
| 293955 ||  || — || October 6, 2007 || Kitt Peak || Spacewatch || — || align=right | 1.5 km || 
|-id=956 bgcolor=#fefefe
| 293956 ||  || — || October 7, 2007 || Catalina || CSS || — || align=right data-sort-value="0.85" | 850 m || 
|-id=957 bgcolor=#E9E9E9
| 293957 ||  || — || October 7, 2007 || Catalina || CSS || — || align=right | 2.4 km || 
|-id=958 bgcolor=#E9E9E9
| 293958 ||  || — || October 7, 2007 || Catalina || CSS || EUN || align=right | 1.7 km || 
|-id=959 bgcolor=#E9E9E9
| 293959 ||  || — || October 6, 2007 || Kitt Peak || Spacewatch || — || align=right | 1.4 km || 
|-id=960 bgcolor=#E9E9E9
| 293960 ||  || — || October 6, 2007 || Kitt Peak || Spacewatch || PAD || align=right | 1.8 km || 
|-id=961 bgcolor=#E9E9E9
| 293961 ||  || — || October 6, 2007 || Kitt Peak || Spacewatch || PAD || align=right | 1.6 km || 
|-id=962 bgcolor=#E9E9E9
| 293962 ||  || — || October 7, 2007 || Mount Lemmon || Mount Lemmon Survey || — || align=right | 1.1 km || 
|-id=963 bgcolor=#E9E9E9
| 293963 ||  || — || October 7, 2007 || Kitt Peak || Spacewatch || WIT || align=right | 1.5 km || 
|-id=964 bgcolor=#E9E9E9
| 293964 ||  || — || October 7, 2007 || Catalina || CSS || WIT || align=right | 1.2 km || 
|-id=965 bgcolor=#FA8072
| 293965 ||  || — || October 7, 2007 || Catalina || CSS || — || align=right | 1.3 km || 
|-id=966 bgcolor=#fefefe
| 293966 ||  || — || October 7, 2007 || Catalina || CSS || — || align=right | 1.5 km || 
|-id=967 bgcolor=#E9E9E9
| 293967 ||  || — || October 7, 2007 || Catalina || CSS || GEF || align=right | 1.8 km || 
|-id=968 bgcolor=#E9E9E9
| 293968 ||  || — || October 4, 2007 || Kitt Peak || Spacewatch || — || align=right | 2.0 km || 
|-id=969 bgcolor=#E9E9E9
| 293969 ||  || — || October 4, 2007 || Kitt Peak || Spacewatch || — || align=right | 1.9 km || 
|-id=970 bgcolor=#E9E9E9
| 293970 ||  || — || October 4, 2007 || Kitt Peak || Spacewatch || HEN || align=right | 1.2 km || 
|-id=971 bgcolor=#E9E9E9
| 293971 ||  || — || October 4, 2007 || Kitt Peak || Spacewatch || — || align=right | 1.8 km || 
|-id=972 bgcolor=#fefefe
| 293972 ||  || — || October 4, 2007 || Kitt Peak || Spacewatch || NYS || align=right data-sort-value="0.72" | 720 m || 
|-id=973 bgcolor=#E9E9E9
| 293973 ||  || — || October 4, 2007 || Kitt Peak || Spacewatch || — || align=right | 2.2 km || 
|-id=974 bgcolor=#E9E9E9
| 293974 ||  || — || October 4, 2007 || Kitt Peak || Spacewatch || HEN || align=right | 1.0 km || 
|-id=975 bgcolor=#E9E9E9
| 293975 ||  || — || October 4, 2007 || Kitt Peak || Spacewatch || — || align=right | 1.2 km || 
|-id=976 bgcolor=#fefefe
| 293976 ||  || — || October 4, 2007 || Kitt Peak || Spacewatch || — || align=right | 1.00 km || 
|-id=977 bgcolor=#E9E9E9
| 293977 ||  || — || October 5, 2007 || Kitt Peak || Spacewatch || — || align=right | 2.1 km || 
|-id=978 bgcolor=#E9E9E9
| 293978 ||  || — || October 5, 2007 || Kitt Peak || Spacewatch || — || align=right | 1.1 km || 
|-id=979 bgcolor=#E9E9E9
| 293979 ||  || — || October 6, 2007 || Kitt Peak || Spacewatch || — || align=right | 1.1 km || 
|-id=980 bgcolor=#d6d6d6
| 293980 ||  || — || October 7, 2007 || Mount Lemmon || Mount Lemmon Survey || EOS || align=right | 1.9 km || 
|-id=981 bgcolor=#E9E9E9
| 293981 ||  || — || October 7, 2007 || Mount Lemmon || Mount Lemmon Survey || — || align=right | 1.6 km || 
|-id=982 bgcolor=#fefefe
| 293982 ||  || — || October 7, 2007 || Mount Lemmon || Mount Lemmon Survey || FLO || align=right data-sort-value="0.68" | 680 m || 
|-id=983 bgcolor=#fefefe
| 293983 ||  || — || October 6, 2007 || Bisei SG Center || BATTeRS || V || align=right data-sort-value="0.94" | 940 m || 
|-id=984 bgcolor=#d6d6d6
| 293984 ||  || — || October 12, 2007 || Dauban || Chante-Perdrix Obs. || KOR || align=right | 1.3 km || 
|-id=985 bgcolor=#E9E9E9
| 293985 Franquin ||  ||  || October 13, 2007 || Saint-Sulpice || B. Christophe || — || align=right | 1.1 km || 
|-id=986 bgcolor=#d6d6d6
| 293986 ||  || — || October 13, 2007 || Altschwendt || W. Ries || — || align=right | 4.0 km || 
|-id=987 bgcolor=#E9E9E9
| 293987 ||  || — || October 10, 2007 || Mount Lemmon || Mount Lemmon Survey || — || align=right | 2.8 km || 
|-id=988 bgcolor=#E9E9E9
| 293988 ||  || — || October 13, 2007 || 7300 || W. K. Y. Yeung || — || align=right | 2.4 km || 
|-id=989 bgcolor=#E9E9E9
| 293989 ||  || — || October 15, 2007 || Bisei SG Center || BATTeRS || — || align=right | 2.2 km || 
|-id=990 bgcolor=#E9E9E9
| 293990 ||  || — || October 15, 2007 || Bisei SG Center || BATTeRS || RAFcritical || align=right data-sort-value="0.80" | 800 m || 
|-id=991 bgcolor=#fefefe
| 293991 ||  || — || October 5, 2007 || Kitt Peak || Spacewatch || FLO || align=right data-sort-value="0.69" | 690 m || 
|-id=992 bgcolor=#fefefe
| 293992 ||  || — || October 5, 2007 || Kitt Peak || Spacewatch || — || align=right data-sort-value="0.93" | 930 m || 
|-id=993 bgcolor=#E9E9E9
| 293993 ||  || — || October 5, 2007 || Kitt Peak || Spacewatch || — || align=right | 1.6 km || 
|-id=994 bgcolor=#E9E9E9
| 293994 ||  || — || October 7, 2007 || Mount Lemmon || Mount Lemmon Survey || MAR || align=right | 1.6 km || 
|-id=995 bgcolor=#d6d6d6
| 293995 ||  || — || October 7, 2007 || Mount Lemmon || Mount Lemmon Survey || KOR || align=right | 1.6 km || 
|-id=996 bgcolor=#E9E9E9
| 293996 ||  || — || October 7, 2007 || Catalina || CSS || — || align=right | 2.2 km || 
|-id=997 bgcolor=#fefefe
| 293997 ||  || — || October 8, 2007 || Catalina || CSS || — || align=right | 1.2 km || 
|-id=998 bgcolor=#fefefe
| 293998 ||  || — || October 8, 2007 || Kitt Peak || Spacewatch || — || align=right data-sort-value="0.73" | 730 m || 
|-id=999 bgcolor=#fefefe
| 293999 ||  || — || October 8, 2007 || Catalina || CSS || — || align=right | 1.1 km || 
|-id=000 bgcolor=#fefefe
| 294000 ||  || — || October 8, 2007 || Mount Lemmon || Mount Lemmon Survey || — || align=right data-sort-value="0.80" | 800 m || 
|}

References

External links 
 Discovery Circumstances: Numbered Minor Planets (290001)–(295000) (IAU Minor Planet Center)

0293